

404001–404100 

|-bgcolor=#d6d6d6
| 404001 ||  || — || December 25, 2005 || Kitt Peak || Spacewatch || — || align=right | 3.4 km || 
|-id=002 bgcolor=#d6d6d6
| 404002 ||  || — || October 29, 2005 || Mount Lemmon || Mount Lemmon Survey || — || align=right | 1.9 km || 
|-id=003 bgcolor=#d6d6d6
| 404003 ||  || — || November 22, 2005 || Kitt Peak || Spacewatch || — || align=right | 2.3 km || 
|-id=004 bgcolor=#d6d6d6
| 404004 ||  || — || January 29, 2012 || Kitt Peak || Spacewatch || — || align=right | 2.9 km || 
|-id=005 bgcolor=#d6d6d6
| 404005 ||  || — || December 31, 2000 || Kitt Peak || Spacewatch || — || align=right | 2.9 km || 
|-id=006 bgcolor=#E9E9E9
| 404006 ||  || — || February 18, 2008 || Mount Lemmon || Mount Lemmon Survey || HNS || align=right | 1.4 km || 
|-id=007 bgcolor=#d6d6d6
| 404007 ||  || — || September 30, 2003 || Kitt Peak || Spacewatch || — || align=right | 2.5 km || 
|-id=008 bgcolor=#d6d6d6
| 404008 ||  || — || February 23, 2007 || Kitt Peak || Spacewatch || — || align=right | 3.0 km || 
|-id=009 bgcolor=#E9E9E9
| 404009 ||  || — || September 19, 2006 || Catalina || CSS || — || align=right | 1.7 km || 
|-id=010 bgcolor=#d6d6d6
| 404010 ||  || — || November 5, 2010 || Mount Lemmon || Mount Lemmon Survey || EOS || align=right | 2.0 km || 
|-id=011 bgcolor=#d6d6d6
| 404011 ||  || — || February 23, 2007 || Kitt Peak || Spacewatch || — || align=right | 2.6 km || 
|-id=012 bgcolor=#E9E9E9
| 404012 ||  || — || November 28, 2010 || Mount Lemmon || Mount Lemmon Survey || HOF || align=right | 2.8 km || 
|-id=013 bgcolor=#d6d6d6
| 404013 ||  || — || September 26, 2009 || Kitt Peak || Spacewatch || THM || align=right | 2.6 km || 
|-id=014 bgcolor=#d6d6d6
| 404014 ||  || — || February 21, 2007 || Mount Lemmon || Mount Lemmon Survey || EOS || align=right | 1.7 km || 
|-id=015 bgcolor=#d6d6d6
| 404015 ||  || — || March 12, 2007 || Kitt Peak || Spacewatch || — || align=right | 3.5 km || 
|-id=016 bgcolor=#d6d6d6
| 404016 ||  || — || November 16, 2010 || Mount Lemmon || Mount Lemmon Survey || — || align=right | 2.9 km || 
|-id=017 bgcolor=#E9E9E9
| 404017 ||  || — || September 25, 2006 || Catalina || CSS || — || align=right | 1.1 km || 
|-id=018 bgcolor=#E9E9E9
| 404018 ||  || — || March 28, 2008 || Kitt Peak || Spacewatch || — || align=right | 1.3 km || 
|-id=019 bgcolor=#d6d6d6
| 404019 ||  || — || January 21, 2012 || Kitt Peak || Spacewatch || — || align=right | 2.8 km || 
|-id=020 bgcolor=#d6d6d6
| 404020 ||  || — || October 17, 2010 || Kitt Peak || Spacewatch || — || align=right | 2.6 km || 
|-id=021 bgcolor=#d6d6d6
| 404021 ||  || — || September 13, 2004 || Kitt Peak || Spacewatch || EOS || align=right | 2.2 km || 
|-id=022 bgcolor=#E9E9E9
| 404022 ||  || — || September 25, 2005 || Kitt Peak || Spacewatch || HOF || align=right | 2.4 km || 
|-id=023 bgcolor=#E9E9E9
| 404023 ||  || — || March 11, 2008 || Siding Spring || SSS || JUN || align=right | 1.4 km || 
|-id=024 bgcolor=#E9E9E9
| 404024 ||  || — || October 19, 2006 || Catalina || CSS || — || align=right | 2.1 km || 
|-id=025 bgcolor=#d6d6d6
| 404025 ||  || — || February 17, 2007 || Kitt Peak || Spacewatch || EOS || align=right | 1.7 km || 
|-id=026 bgcolor=#d6d6d6
| 404026 ||  || — || January 26, 2012 || Kitt Peak || Spacewatch || — || align=right | 4.1 km || 
|-id=027 bgcolor=#E9E9E9
| 404027 ||  || — || January 20, 2012 || Kitt Peak || Spacewatch || — || align=right | 2.2 km || 
|-id=028 bgcolor=#E9E9E9
| 404028 ||  || — || September 15, 2010 || Catalina || CSS || MAR || align=right | 1.00 km || 
|-id=029 bgcolor=#d6d6d6
| 404029 ||  || — || January 8, 2006 || Kitt Peak || Spacewatch || VER || align=right | 3.0 km || 
|-id=030 bgcolor=#d6d6d6
| 404030 ||  || — || March 12, 2007 || Kitt Peak || Spacewatch || EOS || align=right | 2.4 km || 
|-id=031 bgcolor=#E9E9E9
| 404031 ||  || — || November 28, 2011 || Mount Lemmon || Mount Lemmon Survey || — || align=right | 1.8 km || 
|-id=032 bgcolor=#d6d6d6
| 404032 ||  || — || February 27, 2007 || Kitt Peak || Spacewatch || — || align=right | 3.4 km || 
|-id=033 bgcolor=#d6d6d6
| 404033 ||  || — || December 27, 2011 || Mount Lemmon || Mount Lemmon Survey || — || align=right | 3.7 km || 
|-id=034 bgcolor=#E9E9E9
| 404034 ||  || — || September 10, 2010 || Mount Lemmon || Mount Lemmon Survey || EUN || align=right | 1.4 km || 
|-id=035 bgcolor=#E9E9E9
| 404035 ||  || — || November 20, 2006 || Kitt Peak || Spacewatch || NEM || align=right | 1.8 km || 
|-id=036 bgcolor=#d6d6d6
| 404036 ||  || — || February 21, 2007 || Kitt Peak || Spacewatch || EOS || align=right | 2.1 km || 
|-id=037 bgcolor=#d6d6d6
| 404037 ||  || — || January 27, 2007 || Kitt Peak || Spacewatch || — || align=right | 1.9 km || 
|-id=038 bgcolor=#d6d6d6
| 404038 ||  || — || December 21, 2000 || Kitt Peak || Spacewatch || — || align=right | 2.4 km || 
|-id=039 bgcolor=#d6d6d6
| 404039 ||  || — || September 19, 2009 || Mount Lemmon || Mount Lemmon Survey || — || align=right | 3.9 km || 
|-id=040 bgcolor=#d6d6d6
| 404040 ||  || — || August 15, 2009 || Kitt Peak || Spacewatch || VER || align=right | 3.0 km || 
|-id=041 bgcolor=#d6d6d6
| 404041 ||  || — || January 22, 2006 || Mount Lemmon || Mount Lemmon Survey || VER || align=right | 2.6 km || 
|-id=042 bgcolor=#E9E9E9
| 404042 ||  || — || December 5, 2002 || Kitt Peak || Spacewatch || — || align=right | 1.8 km || 
|-id=043 bgcolor=#d6d6d6
| 404043 ||  || — || January 9, 2006 || Kitt Peak || Spacewatch || — || align=right | 2.8 km || 
|-id=044 bgcolor=#d6d6d6
| 404044 ||  || — || December 31, 2005 || Kitt Peak || Spacewatch || — || align=right | 2.9 km || 
|-id=045 bgcolor=#E9E9E9
| 404045 ||  || — || December 26, 2011 || Kitt Peak || Spacewatch || — || align=right | 2.4 km || 
|-id=046 bgcolor=#d6d6d6
| 404046 ||  || — || November 1, 2011 || Mount Lemmon || Mount Lemmon Survey || — || align=right | 3.6 km || 
|-id=047 bgcolor=#fefefe
| 404047 ||  || — || October 29, 2003 || Kitt Peak || Spacewatch || — || align=right data-sort-value="0.99" | 990 m || 
|-id=048 bgcolor=#E9E9E9
| 404048 ||  || — || October 9, 2010 || Mount Lemmon || Mount Lemmon Survey || — || align=right | 1.7 km || 
|-id=049 bgcolor=#d6d6d6
| 404049 ||  || — || January 27, 2007 || Mount Lemmon || Mount Lemmon Survey || EOS || align=right | 1.9 km || 
|-id=050 bgcolor=#d6d6d6
| 404050 ||  || — || January 30, 2012 || Kitt Peak || Spacewatch || EOS || align=right | 2.2 km || 
|-id=051 bgcolor=#d6d6d6
| 404051 ||  || — || March 14, 2007 || Mount Lemmon || Mount Lemmon Survey || — || align=right | 3.7 km || 
|-id=052 bgcolor=#E9E9E9
| 404052 ||  || — || September 18, 2010 || Mount Lemmon || Mount Lemmon Survey || — || align=right | 1.9 km || 
|-id=053 bgcolor=#d6d6d6
| 404053 ||  || — || December 1, 2010 || Kitt Peak || Spacewatch || — || align=right | 3.1 km || 
|-id=054 bgcolor=#d6d6d6
| 404054 ||  || — || February 3, 2012 || Mount Lemmon || Mount Lemmon Survey || EOS || align=right | 2.3 km || 
|-id=055 bgcolor=#d6d6d6
| 404055 ||  || — || October 7, 2004 || Kitt Peak || Spacewatch || — || align=right | 3.1 km || 
|-id=056 bgcolor=#d6d6d6
| 404056 ||  || — || July 25, 2010 || WISE || WISE || — || align=right | 3.9 km || 
|-id=057 bgcolor=#d6d6d6
| 404057 ||  || — || January 30, 2006 || Catalina || CSS || — || align=right | 4.4 km || 
|-id=058 bgcolor=#d6d6d6
| 404058 ||  || — || March 12, 2007 || Catalina || CSS || — || align=right | 3.3 km || 
|-id=059 bgcolor=#d6d6d6
| 404059 ||  || — || February 17, 2007 || Mount Lemmon || Mount Lemmon Survey || — || align=right | 2.7 km || 
|-id=060 bgcolor=#d6d6d6
| 404060 ||  || — || January 23, 2006 || Kitt Peak || Spacewatch || — || align=right | 3.3 km || 
|-id=061 bgcolor=#d6d6d6
| 404061 ||  || — || September 17, 2009 || Kitt Peak || Spacewatch || — || align=right | 3.5 km || 
|-id=062 bgcolor=#E9E9E9
| 404062 ||  || — || August 28, 2005 || Kitt Peak || Spacewatch || — || align=right | 2.3 km || 
|-id=063 bgcolor=#E9E9E9
| 404063 ||  || — || February 17, 2007 || Mount Lemmon || Mount Lemmon Survey || — || align=right | 2.6 km || 
|-id=064 bgcolor=#d6d6d6
| 404064 ||  || — || December 28, 2005 || Kitt Peak || Spacewatch || — || align=right | 3.4 km || 
|-id=065 bgcolor=#d6d6d6
| 404065 ||  || — || January 18, 2010 || WISE || WISE || EOS || align=right | 2.8 km || 
|-id=066 bgcolor=#d6d6d6
| 404066 ||  || — || January 27, 2006 || Mount Lemmon || Mount Lemmon Survey || — || align=right | 2.9 km || 
|-id=067 bgcolor=#d6d6d6
| 404067 ||  || — || March 15, 2007 || Mount Lemmon || Mount Lemmon Survey || — || align=right | 3.7 km || 
|-id=068 bgcolor=#d6d6d6
| 404068 ||  || — || March 16, 2007 || Kitt Peak || Spacewatch || — || align=right | 2.6 km || 
|-id=069 bgcolor=#d6d6d6
| 404069 ||  || — || February 17, 2007 || Kitt Peak || Spacewatch || EOS || align=right | 1.8 km || 
|-id=070 bgcolor=#d6d6d6
| 404070 ||  || — || October 15, 2004 || Mount Lemmon || Mount Lemmon Survey || — || align=right | 4.2 km || 
|-id=071 bgcolor=#d6d6d6
| 404071 ||  || — || December 4, 2005 || Mount Lemmon || Mount Lemmon Survey || THM || align=right | 2.5 km || 
|-id=072 bgcolor=#d6d6d6
| 404072 ||  || — || January 31, 2006 || Kitt Peak || Spacewatch || THM || align=right | 2.3 km || 
|-id=073 bgcolor=#E9E9E9
| 404073 ||  || — || July 29, 2010 || WISE || WISE || — || align=right | 2.3 km || 
|-id=074 bgcolor=#d6d6d6
| 404074 ||  || — || November 26, 2005 || Mount Lemmon || Mount Lemmon Survey || — || align=right | 2.8 km || 
|-id=075 bgcolor=#d6d6d6
| 404075 ||  || — || January 19, 2012 || Kitt Peak || Spacewatch || HYG || align=right | 2.5 km || 
|-id=076 bgcolor=#d6d6d6
| 404076 ||  || — || March 16, 2007 || Kitt Peak || Spacewatch || — || align=right | 3.2 km || 
|-id=077 bgcolor=#d6d6d6
| 404077 ||  || — || September 11, 2004 || Kitt Peak || Spacewatch || — || align=right | 3.4 km || 
|-id=078 bgcolor=#d6d6d6
| 404078 ||  || — || December 21, 2005 || Catalina || CSS || — || align=right | 2.5 km || 
|-id=079 bgcolor=#d6d6d6
| 404079 ||  || — || February 17, 2004 || Kitt Peak || Spacewatch || SHU3:2 || align=right | 5.8 km || 
|-id=080 bgcolor=#d6d6d6
| 404080 ||  || — || September 29, 2009 || Mount Lemmon || Mount Lemmon Survey || — || align=right | 3.6 km || 
|-id=081 bgcolor=#d6d6d6
| 404081 ||  || — || December 13, 2010 || Mount Lemmon || Mount Lemmon Survey || HYG || align=right | 3.5 km || 
|-id=082 bgcolor=#fefefe
| 404082 ||  || — || March 9, 2005 || Mount Lemmon || Mount Lemmon Survey || — || align=right data-sort-value="0.81" | 810 m || 
|-id=083 bgcolor=#d6d6d6
| 404083 ||  || — || April 19, 2007 || Kitt Peak || Spacewatch || — || align=right | 3.2 km || 
|-id=084 bgcolor=#d6d6d6
| 404084 ||  || — || February 22, 2006 || Anderson Mesa || LONEOS || — || align=right | 3.7 km || 
|-id=085 bgcolor=#d6d6d6
| 404085 ||  || — || October 7, 2004 || Socorro || LINEAR || — || align=right | 3.0 km || 
|-id=086 bgcolor=#d6d6d6
| 404086 ||  || — || January 26, 2000 || Kitt Peak || Spacewatch || THM || align=right | 2.7 km || 
|-id=087 bgcolor=#d6d6d6
| 404087 ||  || — || September 19, 2003 || Socorro || LINEAR || — || align=right | 4.1 km || 
|-id=088 bgcolor=#d6d6d6
| 404088 ||  || — || October 9, 2004 || Kitt Peak || Spacewatch || THM || align=right | 2.6 km || 
|-id=089 bgcolor=#d6d6d6
| 404089 ||  || — || November 10, 2005 || Mount Lemmon || Mount Lemmon Survey || — || align=right | 3.6 km || 
|-id=090 bgcolor=#d6d6d6
| 404090 ||  || — || March 10, 2007 || Mount Lemmon || Mount Lemmon Survey || — || align=right | 2.4 km || 
|-id=091 bgcolor=#d6d6d6
| 404091 ||  || — || January 14, 2010 || WISE || WISE || — || align=right | 4.6 km || 
|-id=092 bgcolor=#d6d6d6
| 404092 ||  || — || April 22, 2007 || Kitt Peak || Spacewatch || — || align=right | 2.5 km || 
|-id=093 bgcolor=#d6d6d6
| 404093 ||  || — || September 3, 1997 || Caussols || ODAS || VER || align=right | 3.2 km || 
|-id=094 bgcolor=#d6d6d6
| 404094 ||  || — || December 12, 2004 || Kitt Peak || Spacewatch || — || align=right | 3.3 km || 
|-id=095 bgcolor=#d6d6d6
| 404095 ||  || — || December 27, 2005 || Kitt Peak || Spacewatch || — || align=right | 3.0 km || 
|-id=096 bgcolor=#d6d6d6
| 404096 ||  || — || March 12, 2007 || Kitt Peak || Spacewatch || — || align=right | 2.9 km || 
|-id=097 bgcolor=#d6d6d6
| 404097 ||  || — || September 6, 2008 || Mount Lemmon || Mount Lemmon Survey || — || align=right | 3.1 km || 
|-id=098 bgcolor=#d6d6d6
| 404098 ||  || — || December 28, 2005 || Mount Lemmon || Mount Lemmon Survey || THM || align=right | 2.0 km || 
|-id=099 bgcolor=#d6d6d6
| 404099 ||  || — || February 22, 2012 || Kitt Peak || Spacewatch || — || align=right | 2.9 km || 
|-id=100 bgcolor=#E9E9E9
| 404100 ||  || — || December 24, 2006 || Kitt Peak || Spacewatch || — || align=right | 1.8 km || 
|}

404101–404200 

|-bgcolor=#d6d6d6
| 404101 ||  || — || January 30, 2006 || Kitt Peak || Spacewatch || — || align=right | 3.4 km || 
|-id=102 bgcolor=#d6d6d6
| 404102 ||  || — || November 17, 2010 || Mount Lemmon || Mount Lemmon Survey || — || align=right | 4.3 km || 
|-id=103 bgcolor=#d6d6d6
| 404103 ||  || — || April 23, 2007 || Mount Lemmon || Mount Lemmon Survey || — || align=right | 3.3 km || 
|-id=104 bgcolor=#d6d6d6
| 404104 ||  || — || September 4, 1999 || Kitt Peak || Spacewatch || KOR || align=right | 1.3 km || 
|-id=105 bgcolor=#d6d6d6
| 404105 ||  || — || April 25, 2007 || Kitt Peak || Spacewatch || — || align=right | 2.9 km || 
|-id=106 bgcolor=#d6d6d6
| 404106 ||  || — || February 5, 2000 || Kitt Peak || Spacewatch || — || align=right | 3.5 km || 
|-id=107 bgcolor=#fefefe
| 404107 ||  || — || November 18, 2009 || Kitt Peak || Spacewatch || — || align=right data-sort-value="0.71" | 710 m || 
|-id=108 bgcolor=#FFC2E0
| 404108 ||  || — || September 24, 2012 || Mount Lemmon || Mount Lemmon Survey || APO +1km || align=right | 2.9 km || 
|-id=109 bgcolor=#fefefe
| 404109 ||  || — || May 22, 2003 || Kitt Peak || Spacewatch || H || align=right data-sort-value="0.61" | 610 m || 
|-id=110 bgcolor=#E9E9E9
| 404110 ||  || — || September 22, 2003 || Kitt Peak || Spacewatch || — || align=right | 1.3 km || 
|-id=111 bgcolor=#E9E9E9
| 404111 ||  || — || November 19, 2003 || Anderson Mesa || LONEOS || — || align=right | 2.2 km || 
|-id=112 bgcolor=#FA8072
| 404112 ||  || — || December 30, 2007 || Kitt Peak || Spacewatch || H || align=right data-sort-value="0.65" | 650 m || 
|-id=113 bgcolor=#fefefe
| 404113 ||  || — || January 29, 2006 || Catalina || CSS || — || align=right | 1.2 km || 
|-id=114 bgcolor=#fefefe
| 404114 ||  || — || February 2, 2006 || Anderson Mesa || LONEOS || — || align=right data-sort-value="0.73" | 730 m || 
|-id=115 bgcolor=#fefefe
| 404115 ||  || — || June 15, 2010 || Siding Spring || SSS || — || align=right | 2.0 km || 
|-id=116 bgcolor=#fefefe
| 404116 ||  || — || February 10, 2002 || Anderson Mesa || LONEOS || H || align=right | 1.0 km || 
|-id=117 bgcolor=#fefefe
| 404117 ||  || — || February 20, 2002 || Kitt Peak || Spacewatch || — || align=right data-sort-value="0.93" | 930 m || 
|-id=118 bgcolor=#fefefe
| 404118 ||  || — || November 1, 2008 || Mount Lemmon || Mount Lemmon Survey || — || align=right data-sort-value="0.76" | 760 m || 
|-id=119 bgcolor=#fefefe
| 404119 ||  || — || March 26, 2006 || Kitt Peak || Spacewatch || — || align=right data-sort-value="0.88" | 880 m || 
|-id=120 bgcolor=#fefefe
| 404120 ||  || — || February 20, 2006 || Mount Lemmon || Mount Lemmon Survey || — || align=right data-sort-value="0.83" | 830 m || 
|-id=121 bgcolor=#fefefe
| 404121 ||  || — || February 24, 2006 || Mount Lemmon || Mount Lemmon Survey || — || align=right data-sort-value="0.90" | 900 m || 
|-id=122 bgcolor=#E9E9E9
| 404122 ||  || — || April 13, 2005 || Catalina || CSS || — || align=right data-sort-value="0.94" | 940 m || 
|-id=123 bgcolor=#E9E9E9
| 404123 ||  || — || June 22, 2006 || Kitt Peak || Spacewatch || — || align=right | 2.3 km || 
|-id=124 bgcolor=#fefefe
| 404124 ||  || — || September 11, 2007 || Kitt Peak || Spacewatch || — || align=right | 1.0 km || 
|-id=125 bgcolor=#fefefe
| 404125 ||  || — || February 10, 2002 || Socorro || LINEAR || — || align=right data-sort-value="0.84" | 840 m || 
|-id=126 bgcolor=#fefefe
| 404126 ||  || — || February 1, 2006 || Kitt Peak || Spacewatch || — || align=right data-sort-value="0.77" | 770 m || 
|-id=127 bgcolor=#E9E9E9
| 404127 ||  || — || May 10, 2005 || Mount Lemmon || Mount Lemmon Survey || ADE || align=right | 1.6 km || 
|-id=128 bgcolor=#fefefe
| 404128 ||  || — || March 13, 2010 || Mount Lemmon || Mount Lemmon Survey || — || align=right | 1.0 km || 
|-id=129 bgcolor=#E9E9E9
| 404129 ||  || — || December 22, 2008 || Kitt Peak || Spacewatch || — || align=right | 1.3 km || 
|-id=130 bgcolor=#d6d6d6
| 404130 ||  || — || November 22, 2006 || Kitt Peak || Spacewatch || — || align=right | 3.1 km || 
|-id=131 bgcolor=#fefefe
| 404131 ||  || — || September 23, 2008 || Kitt Peak || Spacewatch || — || align=right data-sort-value="0.60" | 600 m || 
|-id=132 bgcolor=#d6d6d6
| 404132 ||  || — || January 5, 2013 || Kitt Peak || Spacewatch || — || align=right | 3.0 km || 
|-id=133 bgcolor=#fefefe
| 404133 ||  || — || December 28, 2005 || Mount Lemmon || Mount Lemmon Survey || — || align=right data-sort-value="0.75" | 750 m || 
|-id=134 bgcolor=#fefefe
| 404134 ||  || — || September 14, 2007 || Mount Lemmon || Mount Lemmon Survey || — || align=right data-sort-value="0.90" | 900 m || 
|-id=135 bgcolor=#E9E9E9
| 404135 ||  || — || February 27, 2009 || Siding Spring || SSS || — || align=right | 2.1 km || 
|-id=136 bgcolor=#fefefe
| 404136 ||  || — || February 1, 2006 || Mount Lemmon || Mount Lemmon Survey || — || align=right data-sort-value="0.67" | 670 m || 
|-id=137 bgcolor=#fefefe
| 404137 ||  || — || March 24, 2006 || Mount Lemmon || Mount Lemmon Survey || MAS || align=right data-sort-value="0.61" | 610 m || 
|-id=138 bgcolor=#fefefe
| 404138 ||  || — || December 21, 2008 || Kitt Peak || Spacewatch || — || align=right data-sort-value="0.91" | 910 m || 
|-id=139 bgcolor=#fefefe
| 404139 ||  || — || March 13, 2002 || Socorro || LINEAR || — || align=right | 1.1 km || 
|-id=140 bgcolor=#E9E9E9
| 404140 ||  || — || February 4, 2009 || Mount Lemmon || Mount Lemmon Survey || — || align=right data-sort-value="0.88" | 880 m || 
|-id=141 bgcolor=#fefefe
| 404141 ||  || — || November 11, 2001 || Kitt Peak || Spacewatch || — || align=right data-sort-value="0.57" | 570 m || 
|-id=142 bgcolor=#E9E9E9
| 404142 ||  || — || August 28, 2006 || Kitt Peak || Spacewatch || EUN || align=right | 1.1 km || 
|-id=143 bgcolor=#fefefe
| 404143 ||  || — || October 22, 2008 || Kitt Peak || Spacewatch || — || align=right data-sort-value="0.70" | 700 m || 
|-id=144 bgcolor=#fefefe
| 404144 ||  || — || December 30, 2008 || Mount Lemmon || Mount Lemmon Survey || MAS || align=right data-sort-value="0.88" | 880 m || 
|-id=145 bgcolor=#fefefe
| 404145 ||  || — || March 1, 2005 || Kitt Peak || Spacewatch || — || align=right data-sort-value="0.93" | 930 m || 
|-id=146 bgcolor=#fefefe
| 404146 ||  || — || October 26, 2008 || Kitt Peak || Spacewatch || — || align=right data-sort-value="0.68" | 680 m || 
|-id=147 bgcolor=#fefefe
| 404147 ||  || — || January 28, 2006 || Mount Lemmon || Mount Lemmon Survey || — || align=right data-sort-value="0.85" | 850 m || 
|-id=148 bgcolor=#fefefe
| 404148 ||  || — || July 11, 2004 || Socorro || LINEAR || — || align=right data-sort-value="0.69" | 690 m || 
|-id=149 bgcolor=#fefefe
| 404149 ||  || — || January 23, 2006 || Kitt Peak || Spacewatch || — || align=right data-sort-value="0.73" | 730 m || 
|-id=150 bgcolor=#fefefe
| 404150 ||  || — || March 27, 2003 || Campo Imperatore || CINEOS || — || align=right data-sort-value="0.66" | 660 m || 
|-id=151 bgcolor=#FA8072
| 404151 ||  || — || May 12, 2008 || Siding Spring || SSS || Tj (2.91) || align=right | 3.4 km || 
|-id=152 bgcolor=#fefefe
| 404152 ||  || — || August 24, 2007 || Kitt Peak || Spacewatch || — || align=right data-sort-value="0.98" | 980 m || 
|-id=153 bgcolor=#fefefe
| 404153 ||  || — || September 24, 2011 || Mount Lemmon || Mount Lemmon Survey || — || align=right data-sort-value="0.78" | 780 m || 
|-id=154 bgcolor=#E9E9E9
| 404154 ||  || — || January 28, 2009 || Kitt Peak || Spacewatch || — || align=right | 1.1 km || 
|-id=155 bgcolor=#fefefe
| 404155 ||  || — || May 7, 2006 || Mount Lemmon || Mount Lemmon Survey || — || align=right data-sort-value="0.82" | 820 m || 
|-id=156 bgcolor=#fefefe
| 404156 ||  || — || March 5, 2010 || Kitt Peak || Spacewatch || — || align=right data-sort-value="0.65" | 650 m || 
|-id=157 bgcolor=#fefefe
| 404157 ||  || — || February 29, 2000 || Socorro || LINEAR || — || align=right | 1.1 km || 
|-id=158 bgcolor=#fefefe
| 404158 ||  || — || March 2, 2006 || Kitt Peak || Spacewatch || NYS || align=right data-sort-value="0.52" | 520 m || 
|-id=159 bgcolor=#fefefe
| 404159 ||  || — || February 5, 2013 || Kitt Peak || Spacewatch || — || align=right data-sort-value="0.78" | 780 m || 
|-id=160 bgcolor=#E9E9E9
| 404160 ||  || — || January 16, 2009 || Kitt Peak || Spacewatch || — || align=right data-sort-value="0.87" | 870 m || 
|-id=161 bgcolor=#fefefe
| 404161 ||  || — || December 28, 2005 || Mount Lemmon || Mount Lemmon Survey || — || align=right data-sort-value="0.59" | 590 m || 
|-id=162 bgcolor=#E9E9E9
| 404162 ||  || — || February 3, 2009 || Kitt Peak || Spacewatch || — || align=right data-sort-value="0.91" | 910 m || 
|-id=163 bgcolor=#fefefe
| 404163 ||  || — || March 16, 2010 || WISE || WISE || — || align=right | 2.0 km || 
|-id=164 bgcolor=#d6d6d6
| 404164 ||  || — || January 15, 2008 || Kitt Peak || Spacewatch || BRA || align=right | 1.5 km || 
|-id=165 bgcolor=#fefefe
| 404165 ||  || — || January 23, 2006 || Kitt Peak || Spacewatch || — || align=right data-sort-value="0.84" | 840 m || 
|-id=166 bgcolor=#fefefe
| 404166 ||  || — || September 17, 2003 || Kitt Peak || Spacewatch || — || align=right | 1.0 km || 
|-id=167 bgcolor=#fefefe
| 404167 ||  || — || March 5, 2006 || Kitt Peak || Spacewatch || — || align=right | 1.1 km || 
|-id=168 bgcolor=#fefefe
| 404168 ||  || — || February 22, 2006 || Mount Lemmon || Mount Lemmon Survey || NYS || align=right data-sort-value="0.65" | 650 m || 
|-id=169 bgcolor=#fefefe
| 404169 ||  || — || January 11, 2000 || Kitt Peak || Spacewatch || — || align=right data-sort-value="0.64" | 640 m || 
|-id=170 bgcolor=#fefefe
| 404170 ||  || — || February 9, 1999 || Kitt Peak || Spacewatch || — || align=right data-sort-value="0.68" | 680 m || 
|-id=171 bgcolor=#fefefe
| 404171 ||  || — || November 1, 2008 || Mount Lemmon || Mount Lemmon Survey || — || align=right data-sort-value="0.71" | 710 m || 
|-id=172 bgcolor=#E9E9E9
| 404172 ||  || — || April 24, 2009 || Kitt Peak || Spacewatch || — || align=right | 2.1 km || 
|-id=173 bgcolor=#fefefe
| 404173 ||  || — || January 16, 2005 || Kitt Peak || Spacewatch || — || align=right data-sort-value="0.90" | 900 m || 
|-id=174 bgcolor=#fefefe
| 404174 ||  || — || October 25, 2008 || Kitt Peak || Spacewatch || — || align=right data-sort-value="0.76" | 760 m || 
|-id=175 bgcolor=#fefefe
| 404175 ||  || — || March 24, 2006 || Kitt Peak || Spacewatch || — || align=right data-sort-value="0.71" | 710 m || 
|-id=176 bgcolor=#fefefe
| 404176 ||  || — || March 18, 2010 || Kitt Peak || Spacewatch || — || align=right data-sort-value="0.68" | 680 m || 
|-id=177 bgcolor=#fefefe
| 404177 ||  || — || August 27, 2006 || Anderson Mesa || LONEOS || H || align=right data-sort-value="0.78" | 780 m || 
|-id=178 bgcolor=#E9E9E9
| 404178 ||  || — || January 16, 2004 || Catalina || CSS || JUN || align=right | 1.5 km || 
|-id=179 bgcolor=#fefefe
| 404179 ||  || — || December 29, 2005 || Kitt Peak || Spacewatch || — || align=right data-sort-value="0.52" | 520 m || 
|-id=180 bgcolor=#E9E9E9
| 404180 ||  || — || February 24, 2009 || Kitt Peak || Spacewatch || — || align=right | 1.2 km || 
|-id=181 bgcolor=#d6d6d6
| 404181 ||  || — || January 8, 2013 || Mount Lemmon || Mount Lemmon Survey || SYL7:4 || align=right | 3.8 km || 
|-id=182 bgcolor=#E9E9E9
| 404182 ||  || — || March 3, 2005 || Kitt Peak || Spacewatch || — || align=right data-sort-value="0.94" | 940 m || 
|-id=183 bgcolor=#fefefe
| 404183 ||  || — || April 29, 2003 || Socorro || LINEAR || — || align=right data-sort-value="0.85" | 850 m || 
|-id=184 bgcolor=#fefefe
| 404184 ||  || — || July 11, 2004 || Socorro || LINEAR || — || align=right data-sort-value="0.76" | 760 m || 
|-id=185 bgcolor=#fefefe
| 404185 ||  || — || September 28, 2011 || Mount Lemmon || Mount Lemmon Survey || — || align=right data-sort-value="0.90" | 900 m || 
|-id=186 bgcolor=#fefefe
| 404186 ||  || — || October 7, 2004 || Kitt Peak || Spacewatch || V || align=right data-sort-value="0.60" | 600 m || 
|-id=187 bgcolor=#fefefe
| 404187 ||  || — || February 7, 2006 || Mount Lemmon || Mount Lemmon Survey || — || align=right data-sort-value="0.85" | 850 m || 
|-id=188 bgcolor=#fefefe
| 404188 ||  || — || January 30, 2006 || Kitt Peak || Spacewatch || — || align=right data-sort-value="0.73" | 730 m || 
|-id=189 bgcolor=#d6d6d6
| 404189 ||  || — || February 6, 2002 || Socorro || LINEAR || — || align=right | 2.7 km || 
|-id=190 bgcolor=#fefefe
| 404190 ||  || — || April 9, 2006 || Kitt Peak || Spacewatch || — || align=right data-sort-value="0.75" | 750 m || 
|-id=191 bgcolor=#fefefe
| 404191 ||  || — || April 8, 2006 || Kitt Peak || Spacewatch || NYS || align=right data-sort-value="0.76" | 760 m || 
|-id=192 bgcolor=#fefefe
| 404192 ||  || — || October 28, 2011 || Mount Lemmon || Mount Lemmon Survey || V || align=right data-sort-value="0.66" | 660 m || 
|-id=193 bgcolor=#fefefe
| 404193 ||  || — || January 1, 2009 || Kitt Peak || Spacewatch || — || align=right data-sort-value="0.86" | 860 m || 
|-id=194 bgcolor=#fefefe
| 404194 ||  || — || October 26, 2008 || Kitt Peak || Spacewatch || — || align=right data-sort-value="0.63" | 630 m || 
|-id=195 bgcolor=#fefefe
| 404195 ||  || — || October 24, 2011 || Mount Lemmon || Mount Lemmon Survey || (2076) || align=right data-sort-value="0.91" | 910 m || 
|-id=196 bgcolor=#fefefe
| 404196 ||  || — || November 30, 2008 || Kitt Peak || Spacewatch || — || align=right data-sort-value="0.87" | 870 m || 
|-id=197 bgcolor=#fefefe
| 404197 ||  || — || January 17, 2005 || Kitt Peak || Spacewatch || — || align=right | 1.1 km || 
|-id=198 bgcolor=#E9E9E9
| 404198 ||  || — || January 19, 2004 || Kitt Peak || Spacewatch || JUN || align=right | 1.1 km || 
|-id=199 bgcolor=#E9E9E9
| 404199 ||  || — || January 1, 2008 || Kitt Peak || Spacewatch || HOF || align=right | 2.6 km || 
|-id=200 bgcolor=#fefefe
| 404200 ||  || — || March 16, 2002 || Kitt Peak || Spacewatch || NYS || align=right data-sort-value="0.66" | 660 m || 
|}

404201–404300 

|-bgcolor=#E9E9E9
| 404201 ||  || — || February 26, 2009 || Kitt Peak || Spacewatch || — || align=right data-sort-value="0.95" | 950 m || 
|-id=202 bgcolor=#fefefe
| 404202 ||  || — || September 23, 2011 || Kitt Peak || Spacewatch || — || align=right data-sort-value="0.77" | 770 m || 
|-id=203 bgcolor=#fefefe
| 404203 ||  || — || April 6, 1994 || Kitt Peak || Spacewatch || — || align=right data-sort-value="0.86" | 860 m || 
|-id=204 bgcolor=#fefefe
| 404204 ||  || — || May 11, 2010 || Mount Lemmon || Mount Lemmon Survey || V || align=right data-sort-value="0.74" | 740 m || 
|-id=205 bgcolor=#E9E9E9
| 404205 ||  || — || February 21, 2009 || Kitt Peak || Spacewatch || — || align=right data-sort-value="0.93" | 930 m || 
|-id=206 bgcolor=#fefefe
| 404206 ||  || — || February 18, 2010 || Mount Lemmon || Mount Lemmon Survey || — || align=right data-sort-value="0.59" | 590 m || 
|-id=207 bgcolor=#fefefe
| 404207 ||  || — || September 16, 2003 || Kitt Peak || Spacewatch || — || align=right data-sort-value="0.98" | 980 m || 
|-id=208 bgcolor=#E9E9E9
| 404208 ||  || — || February 20, 2009 || Kitt Peak || Spacewatch || — || align=right data-sort-value="0.98" | 980 m || 
|-id=209 bgcolor=#fefefe
| 404209 ||  || — || January 28, 2006 || Mount Lemmon || Mount Lemmon Survey || — || align=right data-sort-value="0.81" | 810 m || 
|-id=210 bgcolor=#fefefe
| 404210 ||  || — || March 13, 2005 || Mount Lemmon || Mount Lemmon Survey || — || align=right data-sort-value="0.88" | 880 m || 
|-id=211 bgcolor=#fefefe
| 404211 ||  || — || December 2, 2008 || Mount Lemmon || Mount Lemmon Survey || NYS || align=right data-sort-value="0.72" | 720 m || 
|-id=212 bgcolor=#fefefe
| 404212 ||  || — || January 28, 2006 || Kitt Peak || Spacewatch || V || align=right data-sort-value="0.74" | 740 m || 
|-id=213 bgcolor=#fefefe
| 404213 ||  || — || April 11, 2010 || Mount Lemmon || Mount Lemmon Survey || — || align=right data-sort-value="0.80" | 800 m || 
|-id=214 bgcolor=#fefefe
| 404214 ||  || — || March 14, 2000 || Kitt Peak || Spacewatch || — || align=right data-sort-value="0.67" | 670 m || 
|-id=215 bgcolor=#fefefe
| 404215 ||  || — || March 3, 2006 || Kitt Peak || Spacewatch || V || align=right data-sort-value="0.63" | 630 m || 
|-id=216 bgcolor=#fefefe
| 404216 ||  || — || September 29, 2008 || Mount Lemmon || Mount Lemmon Survey || — || align=right data-sort-value="0.86" | 860 m || 
|-id=217 bgcolor=#fefefe
| 404217 ||  || — || December 14, 2001 || Socorro || LINEAR || — || align=right data-sort-value="0.87" | 870 m || 
|-id=218 bgcolor=#E9E9E9
| 404218 ||  || — || February 15, 2009 || Catalina || CSS || EUN || align=right | 1.2 km || 
|-id=219 bgcolor=#d6d6d6
| 404219 ||  || — || June 10, 2010 || WISE || WISE || — || align=right | 3.9 km || 
|-id=220 bgcolor=#E9E9E9
| 404220 ||  || — || March 12, 2005 || Socorro || LINEAR || — || align=right data-sort-value="0.91" | 910 m || 
|-id=221 bgcolor=#fefefe
| 404221 ||  || — || October 1, 2005 || Kitt Peak || Spacewatch || — || align=right data-sort-value="0.62" | 620 m || 
|-id=222 bgcolor=#fefefe
| 404222 ||  || — || December 30, 2005 || Kitt Peak || Spacewatch || — || align=right data-sort-value="0.67" | 670 m || 
|-id=223 bgcolor=#fefefe
| 404223 ||  || — || May 10, 2003 || Kitt Peak || Spacewatch || V || align=right data-sort-value="0.55" | 550 m || 
|-id=224 bgcolor=#fefefe
| 404224 ||  || — || September 21, 2011 || Catalina || CSS || — || align=right | 1.1 km || 
|-id=225 bgcolor=#fefefe
| 404225 ||  || — || January 1, 2009 || Kitt Peak || Spacewatch || — || align=right data-sort-value="0.68" | 680 m || 
|-id=226 bgcolor=#E9E9E9
| 404226 ||  || — || April 19, 2009 || Mount Lemmon || Mount Lemmon Survey || MIS || align=right | 2.2 km || 
|-id=227 bgcolor=#fefefe
| 404227 ||  || — || March 23, 2006 || Catalina || CSS || — || align=right data-sort-value="0.72" | 720 m || 
|-id=228 bgcolor=#E9E9E9
| 404228 ||  || — || October 12, 2007 || Mount Lemmon || Mount Lemmon Survey || — || align=right data-sort-value="0.93" | 930 m || 
|-id=229 bgcolor=#fefefe
| 404229 ||  || — || January 26, 2009 || Mount Lemmon || Mount Lemmon Survey || — || align=right data-sort-value="0.74" | 740 m || 
|-id=230 bgcolor=#fefefe
| 404230 ||  || — || December 25, 2005 || Mount Lemmon || Mount Lemmon Survey || — || align=right data-sort-value="0.71" | 710 m || 
|-id=231 bgcolor=#E9E9E9
| 404231 ||  || — || January 25, 2009 || Kitt Peak || Spacewatch || — || align=right data-sort-value="0.71" | 710 m || 
|-id=232 bgcolor=#fefefe
| 404232 ||  || — || December 18, 2001 || Kitt Peak || Spacewatch || — || align=right data-sort-value="0.81" | 810 m || 
|-id=233 bgcolor=#E9E9E9
| 404233 ||  || — || February 20, 2009 || Catalina || CSS || EUN || align=right | 1.4 km || 
|-id=234 bgcolor=#E9E9E9
| 404234 ||  || — || August 13, 2010 || Kitt Peak || Spacewatch || — || align=right | 1.8 km || 
|-id=235 bgcolor=#fefefe
| 404235 ||  || — || February 28, 2009 || Mount Lemmon || Mount Lemmon Survey || NYS || align=right data-sort-value="0.69" | 690 m || 
|-id=236 bgcolor=#fefefe
| 404236 ||  || — || September 13, 2007 || Kitt Peak || Spacewatch || NYS || align=right data-sort-value="0.61" | 610 m || 
|-id=237 bgcolor=#fefefe
| 404237 ||  || — || September 21, 2003 || Kitt Peak || Spacewatch || NYS || align=right data-sort-value="0.67" | 670 m || 
|-id=238 bgcolor=#fefefe
| 404238 ||  || — || August 23, 2007 || Kitt Peak || Spacewatch || — || align=right data-sort-value="0.81" | 810 m || 
|-id=239 bgcolor=#fefefe
| 404239 ||  || — || April 24, 2006 || Kitt Peak || Spacewatch || — || align=right data-sort-value="0.73" | 730 m || 
|-id=240 bgcolor=#d6d6d6
| 404240 ||  || — || August 18, 2009 || Kitt Peak || Spacewatch || — || align=right | 2.4 km || 
|-id=241 bgcolor=#E9E9E9
| 404241 ||  || — || June 3, 2005 || Kitt Peak || Spacewatch || — || align=right | 1.8 km || 
|-id=242 bgcolor=#E9E9E9
| 404242 ||  || — || February 2, 2000 || Socorro || LINEAR || — || align=right | 1.9 km || 
|-id=243 bgcolor=#fefefe
| 404243 ||  || — || September 11, 2007 || Catalina || CSS || — || align=right | 1.0 km || 
|-id=244 bgcolor=#fefefe
| 404244 ||  || — || December 22, 2008 || Kitt Peak || Spacewatch || — || align=right data-sort-value="0.72" | 720 m || 
|-id=245 bgcolor=#fefefe
| 404245 ||  || — || October 29, 2008 || Kitt Peak || Spacewatch || — || align=right data-sort-value="0.59" | 590 m || 
|-id=246 bgcolor=#E9E9E9
| 404246 ||  || — || January 10, 2008 || Mount Lemmon || Mount Lemmon Survey || — || align=right | 2.4 km || 
|-id=247 bgcolor=#E9E9E9
| 404247 ||  || — || October 20, 2006 || Mount Lemmon || Mount Lemmon Survey || — || align=right | 3.0 km || 
|-id=248 bgcolor=#E9E9E9
| 404248 ||  || — || April 5, 2000 || Socorro || LINEAR || — || align=right | 2.1 km || 
|-id=249 bgcolor=#E9E9E9
| 404249 ||  || — || March 1, 2009 || Kitt Peak || Spacewatch || — || align=right | 4.0 km || 
|-id=250 bgcolor=#fefefe
| 404250 ||  || — || September 7, 2004 || Kitt Peak || Spacewatch || — || align=right data-sort-value="0.79" | 790 m || 
|-id=251 bgcolor=#E9E9E9
| 404251 ||  || — || May 8, 2005 || Mount Lemmon || Mount Lemmon Survey || — || align=right | 1.6 km || 
|-id=252 bgcolor=#d6d6d6
| 404252 ||  || — || November 27, 2006 || Kitt Peak || Spacewatch || — || align=right | 2.4 km || 
|-id=253 bgcolor=#E9E9E9
| 404253 ||  || — || May 11, 2005 || Catalina || CSS || KRM || align=right | 2.8 km || 
|-id=254 bgcolor=#E9E9E9
| 404254 ||  || — || September 11, 2010 || Mount Lemmon || Mount Lemmon Survey || EUN || align=right | 1.6 km || 
|-id=255 bgcolor=#fefefe
| 404255 ||  || — || September 18, 2003 || Kitt Peak || Spacewatch || — || align=right | 1.2 km || 
|-id=256 bgcolor=#fefefe
| 404256 ||  || — || October 18, 2003 || Kitt Peak || Spacewatch || — || align=right | 1.0 km || 
|-id=257 bgcolor=#E9E9E9
| 404257 ||  || — || March 24, 2001 || Kitt Peak || Spacewatch || — || align=right | 1.0 km || 
|-id=258 bgcolor=#E9E9E9
| 404258 ||  || — || April 5, 2000 || Socorro || LINEAR || — || align=right | 1.7 km || 
|-id=259 bgcolor=#fefefe
| 404259 ||  || — || April 11, 2003 || Kitt Peak || Spacewatch || — || align=right data-sort-value="0.71" | 710 m || 
|-id=260 bgcolor=#d6d6d6
| 404260 ||  || — || January 10, 2007 || Mount Lemmon || Mount Lemmon Survey || — || align=right | 3.7 km || 
|-id=261 bgcolor=#fefefe
| 404261 ||  || — || October 18, 1995 || Kitt Peak || Spacewatch || — || align=right data-sort-value="0.65" | 650 m || 
|-id=262 bgcolor=#E9E9E9
| 404262 ||  || — || March 3, 2005 || Kitt Peak || Spacewatch || — || align=right | 2.1 km || 
|-id=263 bgcolor=#E9E9E9
| 404263 ||  || — || August 30, 2005 || Kitt Peak || Spacewatch || — || align=right | 2.2 km || 
|-id=264 bgcolor=#fefefe
| 404264 ||  || — || September 7, 2004 || Kitt Peak || Spacewatch || — || align=right data-sort-value="0.60" | 600 m || 
|-id=265 bgcolor=#E9E9E9
| 404265 ||  || — || May 10, 2005 || Kitt Peak || Spacewatch || — || align=right data-sort-value="0.96" | 960 m || 
|-id=266 bgcolor=#d6d6d6
| 404266 ||  || — || March 27, 2008 || Kitt Peak || Spacewatch || — || align=right | 2.4 km || 
|-id=267 bgcolor=#fefefe
| 404267 ||  || — || November 2, 2007 || Kitt Peak || Spacewatch || — || align=right data-sort-value="0.98" | 980 m || 
|-id=268 bgcolor=#E9E9E9
| 404268 ||  || — || March 18, 2004 || Kitt Peak || Spacewatch || — || align=right | 2.2 km || 
|-id=269 bgcolor=#fefefe
| 404269 ||  || — || December 24, 2005 || Kitt Peak || Spacewatch || — || align=right data-sort-value="0.73" | 730 m || 
|-id=270 bgcolor=#E9E9E9
| 404270 ||  || — || March 21, 2009 || Catalina || CSS || — || align=right | 1.2 km || 
|-id=271 bgcolor=#E9E9E9
| 404271 ||  || — || April 5, 2000 || Kitt Peak || Spacewatch || — || align=right | 1.4 km || 
|-id=272 bgcolor=#fefefe
| 404272 ||  || — || April 25, 2006 || Mount Lemmon || Mount Lemmon Survey || — || align=right data-sort-value="0.95" | 950 m || 
|-id=273 bgcolor=#d6d6d6
| 404273 ||  || — || December 27, 2011 || Mount Lemmon || Mount Lemmon Survey || 3:2 || align=right | 4.5 km || 
|-id=274 bgcolor=#E9E9E9
| 404274 ||  || — || April 27, 2009 || Mount Lemmon || Mount Lemmon Survey || — || align=right | 1.6 km || 
|-id=275 bgcolor=#d6d6d6
| 404275 ||  || — || January 17, 2007 || Kitt Peak || Spacewatch || — || align=right | 2.8 km || 
|-id=276 bgcolor=#E9E9E9
| 404276 ||  || — || November 24, 2011 || Mount Lemmon || Mount Lemmon Survey || — || align=right | 2.0 km || 
|-id=277 bgcolor=#fefefe
| 404277 ||  || — || April 2, 2006 || Catalina || CSS || — || align=right | 1.3 km || 
|-id=278 bgcolor=#fefefe
| 404278 ||  || — || June 19, 2010 || Mount Lemmon || Mount Lemmon Survey || — || align=right data-sort-value="0.83" | 830 m || 
|-id=279 bgcolor=#fefefe
| 404279 ||  || — || October 20, 2011 || Mount Lemmon || Mount Lemmon Survey || — || align=right data-sort-value="0.97" | 970 m || 
|-id=280 bgcolor=#fefefe
| 404280 ||  || — || December 5, 2008 || Kitt Peak || Spacewatch || — || align=right data-sort-value="0.88" | 880 m || 
|-id=281 bgcolor=#fefefe
| 404281 ||  || — || May 23, 2006 || Kitt Peak || Spacewatch || — || align=right | 1.0 km || 
|-id=282 bgcolor=#fefefe
| 404282 ||  || — || February 25, 2006 || Kitt Peak || Spacewatch || — || align=right | 1.1 km || 
|-id=283 bgcolor=#E9E9E9
| 404283 ||  || — || February 22, 2004 || Kitt Peak || Spacewatch || — || align=right | 1.4 km || 
|-id=284 bgcolor=#E9E9E9
| 404284 ||  || — || April 15, 2001 || Kitt Peak || Spacewatch || — || align=right data-sort-value="0.86" | 860 m || 
|-id=285 bgcolor=#d6d6d6
| 404285 ||  || — || April 12, 2008 || Mount Lemmon || Mount Lemmon Survey || — || align=right | 2.8 km || 
|-id=286 bgcolor=#E9E9E9
| 404286 ||  || — || March 18, 2004 || Kitt Peak || Spacewatch || — || align=right | 2.2 km || 
|-id=287 bgcolor=#d6d6d6
| 404287 ||  || — || December 27, 2011 || Kitt Peak || Spacewatch || — || align=right | 2.6 km || 
|-id=288 bgcolor=#fefefe
| 404288 ||  || — || April 29, 2006 || Kitt Peak || Spacewatch || V || align=right data-sort-value="0.53" | 530 m || 
|-id=289 bgcolor=#E9E9E9
| 404289 ||  || — || October 3, 2006 || Mount Lemmon || Mount Lemmon Survey || — || align=right | 2.1 km || 
|-id=290 bgcolor=#E9E9E9
| 404290 ||  || — || May 7, 2005 || Kitt Peak || Spacewatch || — || align=right | 2.1 km || 
|-id=291 bgcolor=#E9E9E9
| 404291 ||  || — || November 18, 2007 || Mount Lemmon || Mount Lemmon Survey || — || align=right | 1.2 km || 
|-id=292 bgcolor=#E9E9E9
| 404292 ||  || — || May 3, 1997 || Kitt Peak || Spacewatch || — || align=right data-sort-value="0.98" | 980 m || 
|-id=293 bgcolor=#d6d6d6
| 404293 ||  || — || December 13, 2006 || Kitt Peak || Spacewatch || EOS || align=right | 2.1 km || 
|-id=294 bgcolor=#E9E9E9
| 404294 ||  || — || December 12, 2006 || Kitt Peak || Spacewatch || AGN || align=right | 1.4 km || 
|-id=295 bgcolor=#E9E9E9
| 404295 ||  || — || September 20, 1998 || Kitt Peak || Spacewatch || — || align=right | 1.2 km || 
|-id=296 bgcolor=#E9E9E9
| 404296 ||  || — || April 28, 2004 || Kitt Peak || Spacewatch || — || align=right | 1.7 km || 
|-id=297 bgcolor=#E9E9E9
| 404297 ||  || — || October 22, 2006 || Kitt Peak || Spacewatch || AGN || align=right | 1.4 km || 
|-id=298 bgcolor=#E9E9E9
| 404298 ||  || — || February 15, 2004 || Socorro || LINEAR || — || align=right | 1.6 km || 
|-id=299 bgcolor=#E9E9E9
| 404299 ||  || — || November 7, 2007 || Kitt Peak || Spacewatch || — || align=right | 1.2 km || 
|-id=300 bgcolor=#fefefe
| 404300 ||  || — || January 1, 2009 || Kitt Peak || Spacewatch || V || align=right data-sort-value="0.73" | 730 m || 
|}

404301–404400 

|-bgcolor=#fefefe
| 404301 ||  || — || February 24, 2006 || Mount Lemmon || Mount Lemmon Survey || MAS || align=right data-sort-value="0.78" | 780 m || 
|-id=302 bgcolor=#E9E9E9
| 404302 ||  || — || April 26, 2000 || Kitt Peak || Spacewatch || NEM || align=right | 1.7 km || 
|-id=303 bgcolor=#fefefe
| 404303 ||  || — || October 7, 1999 || Kitt Peak || Spacewatch || — || align=right | 1.2 km || 
|-id=304 bgcolor=#E9E9E9
| 404304 ||  || — || February 9, 2008 || Mount Lemmon || Mount Lemmon Survey || — || align=right | 2.1 km || 
|-id=305 bgcolor=#fefefe
| 404305 ||  || — || October 7, 2004 || Kitt Peak || Spacewatch || — || align=right data-sort-value="0.78" | 780 m || 
|-id=306 bgcolor=#fefefe
| 404306 ||  || — || December 21, 2008 || Kitt Peak || Spacewatch || — || align=right data-sort-value="0.61" | 610 m || 
|-id=307 bgcolor=#E9E9E9
| 404307 ||  || — || October 21, 2006 || Mount Lemmon || Mount Lemmon Survey || — || align=right | 2.2 km || 
|-id=308 bgcolor=#fefefe
| 404308 ||  || — || September 3, 1999 || Kitt Peak || Spacewatch || — || align=right | 1.3 km || 
|-id=309 bgcolor=#fefefe
| 404309 ||  || — || April 25, 2003 || Kitt Peak || Spacewatch || — || align=right data-sort-value="0.77" | 770 m || 
|-id=310 bgcolor=#d6d6d6
| 404310 ||  || — || October 27, 2005 || Mount Lemmon || Mount Lemmon Survey || — || align=right | 2.7 km || 
|-id=311 bgcolor=#E9E9E9
| 404311 ||  || — || May 14, 2004 || Kitt Peak || Spacewatch || — || align=right | 2.8 km || 
|-id=312 bgcolor=#fefefe
| 404312 ||  || — || February 3, 2009 || Kitt Peak || Spacewatch || — || align=right data-sort-value="0.73" | 730 m || 
|-id=313 bgcolor=#E9E9E9
| 404313 ||  || — || September 28, 2006 || Kitt Peak || Spacewatch || — || align=right | 1.4 km || 
|-id=314 bgcolor=#E9E9E9
| 404314 ||  || — || February 27, 2009 || Siding Spring || SSS || EUN || align=right | 1.6 km || 
|-id=315 bgcolor=#E9E9E9
| 404315 ||  || — || November 17, 2006 || Mount Lemmon || Mount Lemmon Survey || — || align=right | 1.8 km || 
|-id=316 bgcolor=#FA8072
| 404316 ||  || — || May 9, 2004 || Kitt Peak || Spacewatch || — || align=right data-sort-value="0.96" | 960 m || 
|-id=317 bgcolor=#fefefe
| 404317 ||  || — || February 2, 2009 || Mount Lemmon || Mount Lemmon Survey || — || align=right | 1.2 km || 
|-id=318 bgcolor=#E9E9E9
| 404318 ||  || — || November 4, 2007 || Kitt Peak || Spacewatch || — || align=right | 1.3 km || 
|-id=319 bgcolor=#fefefe
| 404319 ||  || — || April 25, 2006 || Kitt Peak || Spacewatch || — || align=right data-sort-value="0.94" | 940 m || 
|-id=320 bgcolor=#E9E9E9
| 404320 ||  || — || September 30, 2010 || Mount Lemmon || Mount Lemmon Survey || MRX || align=right | 1.4 km || 
|-id=321 bgcolor=#fefefe
| 404321 ||  || — || January 20, 2009 || Catalina || CSS || — || align=right data-sort-value="0.91" | 910 m || 
|-id=322 bgcolor=#fefefe
| 404322 ||  || — || May 19, 2006 || Mount Lemmon || Mount Lemmon Survey || MAS || align=right data-sort-value="0.96" | 960 m || 
|-id=323 bgcolor=#E9E9E9
| 404323 ||  || — || March 21, 2004 || Kitt Peak || Spacewatch || DOR || align=right | 2.4 km || 
|-id=324 bgcolor=#fefefe
| 404324 ||  || — || December 31, 2008 || Mount Lemmon || Mount Lemmon Survey || V || align=right data-sort-value="0.73" | 730 m || 
|-id=325 bgcolor=#fefefe
| 404325 ||  || — || March 10, 2005 || Anderson Mesa || LONEOS || — || align=right data-sort-value="0.91" | 910 m || 
|-id=326 bgcolor=#E9E9E9
| 404326 ||  || — || April 20, 2009 || Catalina || CSS || — || align=right | 1.4 km || 
|-id=327 bgcolor=#E9E9E9
| 404327 ||  || — || April 16, 2005 || Catalina || CSS || — || align=right | 1.3 km || 
|-id=328 bgcolor=#fefefe
| 404328 ||  || — || April 30, 2006 || Kitt Peak || Spacewatch || — || align=right data-sort-value="0.88" | 880 m || 
|-id=329 bgcolor=#fefefe
| 404329 ||  || — || January 17, 2009 || Kitt Peak || Spacewatch || V || align=right data-sort-value="0.67" | 670 m || 
|-id=330 bgcolor=#d6d6d6
| 404330 ||  || — || April 6, 2008 || Kitt Peak || Spacewatch || — || align=right | 2.4 km || 
|-id=331 bgcolor=#E9E9E9
| 404331 ||  || — || October 10, 2007 || Mount Lemmon || Mount Lemmon Survey || — || align=right | 1.0 km || 
|-id=332 bgcolor=#E9E9E9
| 404332 ||  || — || October 2, 2006 || Mount Lemmon || Mount Lemmon Survey || — || align=right | 1.3 km || 
|-id=333 bgcolor=#fefefe
| 404333 ||  || — || June 1, 2003 || Kitt Peak || Spacewatch || V || align=right data-sort-value="0.65" | 650 m || 
|-id=334 bgcolor=#E9E9E9
| 404334 ||  || — || September 13, 2005 || Kitt Peak || Spacewatch || DOR || align=right | 2.4 km || 
|-id=335 bgcolor=#E9E9E9
| 404335 ||  || — || September 18, 2010 || Mount Lemmon || Mount Lemmon Survey || NEM || align=right | 2.4 km || 
|-id=336 bgcolor=#fefefe
| 404336 ||  || — || March 24, 2006 || Mount Lemmon || Mount Lemmon Survey || V || align=right data-sort-value="0.53" | 530 m || 
|-id=337 bgcolor=#E9E9E9
| 404337 ||  || — || November 14, 2006 || Kitt Peak || Spacewatch || — || align=right | 1.5 km || 
|-id=338 bgcolor=#E9E9E9
| 404338 ||  || — || April 17, 2005 || Kitt Peak || Spacewatch || — || align=right data-sort-value="0.83" | 830 m || 
|-id=339 bgcolor=#E9E9E9
| 404339 ||  || — || February 28, 2008 || Mount Lemmon || Mount Lemmon Survey || — || align=right | 2.4 km || 
|-id=340 bgcolor=#fefefe
| 404340 ||  || — || September 22, 2001 || Kitt Peak || Spacewatch || — || align=right data-sort-value="0.70" | 700 m || 
|-id=341 bgcolor=#fefefe
| 404341 ||  || — || January 23, 2006 || Kitt Peak || Spacewatch || — || align=right data-sort-value="0.87" | 870 m || 
|-id=342 bgcolor=#d6d6d6
| 404342 ||  || — || August 27, 2009 || Kitt Peak || Spacewatch || THM || align=right | 2.3 km || 
|-id=343 bgcolor=#d6d6d6
| 404343 ||  || — || April 12, 2002 || Kitt Peak || Spacewatch || THM || align=right | 2.3 km || 
|-id=344 bgcolor=#E9E9E9
| 404344 ||  || — || March 12, 2013 || Kitt Peak || Spacewatch || — || align=right | 2.0 km || 
|-id=345 bgcolor=#E9E9E9
| 404345 ||  || — || December 10, 2006 || Kitt Peak || Spacewatch || HOF || align=right | 2.7 km || 
|-id=346 bgcolor=#E9E9E9
| 404346 ||  || — || October 13, 2006 || Kitt Peak || Spacewatch || — || align=right | 1.5 km || 
|-id=347 bgcolor=#E9E9E9
| 404347 ||  || — || March 19, 2004 || Kitt Peak || Spacewatch || — || align=right | 1.5 km || 
|-id=348 bgcolor=#fefefe
| 404348 ||  || — || March 23, 2003 || Kitt Peak || Spacewatch || — || align=right data-sort-value="0.82" | 820 m || 
|-id=349 bgcolor=#E9E9E9
| 404349 ||  || — || March 6, 1999 || Kitt Peak || Spacewatch || GAL || align=right | 1.7 km || 
|-id=350 bgcolor=#E9E9E9
| 404350 ||  || — || September 24, 2000 || Anderson Mesa || LONEOS || — || align=right | 2.9 km || 
|-id=351 bgcolor=#E9E9E9
| 404351 ||  || — || March 17, 2004 || Kitt Peak || Spacewatch || — || align=right | 1.8 km || 
|-id=352 bgcolor=#d6d6d6
| 404352 ||  || — || September 29, 2005 || Mount Lemmon || Mount Lemmon Survey || — || align=right | 2.5 km || 
|-id=353 bgcolor=#fefefe
| 404353 ||  || — || December 3, 2004 || Kitt Peak || Spacewatch || — || align=right data-sort-value="0.85" | 850 m || 
|-id=354 bgcolor=#fefefe
| 404354 ||  || — || January 19, 2005 || Kitt Peak || Spacewatch || NYS || align=right data-sort-value="0.68" | 680 m || 
|-id=355 bgcolor=#fefefe
| 404355 ||  || — || March 26, 2006 || Kitt Peak || Spacewatch || — || align=right data-sort-value="0.91" | 910 m || 
|-id=356 bgcolor=#E9E9E9
| 404356 ||  || — || May 1, 2009 || Kitt Peak || Spacewatch || — || align=right | 1.5 km || 
|-id=357 bgcolor=#fefefe
| 404357 ||  || — || January 17, 2005 || Kitt Peak || Spacewatch || — || align=right data-sort-value="0.75" | 750 m || 
|-id=358 bgcolor=#d6d6d6
| 404358 ||  || — || February 9, 2007 || Kitt Peak || Spacewatch || Tj (2.98) || align=right | 3.2 km || 
|-id=359 bgcolor=#fefefe
| 404359 ||  || — || September 10, 2007 || Mount Lemmon || Mount Lemmon Survey || V || align=right data-sort-value="0.57" | 570 m || 
|-id=360 bgcolor=#fefefe
| 404360 ||  || — || September 4, 2007 || Catalina || CSS || — || align=right data-sort-value="0.76" | 760 m || 
|-id=361 bgcolor=#fefefe
| 404361 ||  || — || February 1, 2006 || Mount Lemmon || Mount Lemmon Survey || — || align=right data-sort-value="0.69" | 690 m || 
|-id=362 bgcolor=#E9E9E9
| 404362 ||  || — || February 2, 2008 || Kitt Peak || Spacewatch || — || align=right | 2.6 km || 
|-id=363 bgcolor=#E9E9E9
| 404363 ||  || — || February 13, 2004 || Kitt Peak || Spacewatch || — || align=right | 1.5 km || 
|-id=364 bgcolor=#E9E9E9
| 404364 ||  || — || February 13, 2008 || Kitt Peak || Spacewatch || — || align=right | 1.9 km || 
|-id=365 bgcolor=#E9E9E9
| 404365 ||  || — || October 23, 2006 || Kitt Peak || Spacewatch || — || align=right | 1.7 km || 
|-id=366 bgcolor=#d6d6d6
| 404366 ||  || — || February 25, 2007 || Kitt Peak || Spacewatch || THM || align=right | 2.3 km || 
|-id=367 bgcolor=#E9E9E9
| 404367 ||  || — || October 13, 1998 || Kitt Peak || Spacewatch || — || align=right | 1.1 km || 
|-id=368 bgcolor=#E9E9E9
| 404368 ||  || — || September 28, 1997 || Kitt Peak || Spacewatch || — || align=right | 1.1 km || 
|-id=369 bgcolor=#fefefe
| 404369 ||  || — || February 10, 2002 || Socorro || LINEAR || V || align=right data-sort-value="0.75" | 750 m || 
|-id=370 bgcolor=#E9E9E9
| 404370 ||  || — || September 5, 2010 || Mount Lemmon || Mount Lemmon Survey || — || align=right | 1.3 km || 
|-id=371 bgcolor=#E9E9E9
| 404371 ||  || — || March 31, 2009 || Mount Lemmon || Mount Lemmon Survey || — || align=right data-sort-value="0.86" | 860 m || 
|-id=372 bgcolor=#E9E9E9
| 404372 ||  || — || April 18, 2009 || Mount Lemmon || Mount Lemmon Survey || — || align=right | 1.2 km || 
|-id=373 bgcolor=#E9E9E9
| 404373 ||  || — || July 31, 2005 || Palomar || NEAT || EUN || align=right | 1.4 km || 
|-id=374 bgcolor=#E9E9E9
| 404374 ||  || — || April 15, 2005 || Catalina || CSS || EUN || align=right | 1.5 km || 
|-id=375 bgcolor=#fefefe
| 404375 ||  || — || November 25, 2000 || Kitt Peak || Spacewatch || V || align=right data-sort-value="0.66" | 660 m || 
|-id=376 bgcolor=#E9E9E9
| 404376 ||  || — || March 10, 2005 || Mount Lemmon || Mount Lemmon Survey || — || align=right | 1.3 km || 
|-id=377 bgcolor=#E9E9E9
| 404377 ||  || — || March 11, 2005 || Mount Lemmon || Mount Lemmon Survey || — || align=right | 1.1 km || 
|-id=378 bgcolor=#E9E9E9
| 404378 ||  || — || October 22, 2006 || Kitt Peak || Spacewatch ||  || align=right | 2.0 km || 
|-id=379 bgcolor=#d6d6d6
| 404379 ||  || — || September 16, 2009 || Kitt Peak || Spacewatch || — || align=right | 2.5 km || 
|-id=380 bgcolor=#E9E9E9
| 404380 ||  || — || March 17, 2009 || Kitt Peak || Spacewatch || — || align=right | 1.1 km || 
|-id=381 bgcolor=#fefefe
| 404381 ||  || — || May 3, 2006 || Mount Lemmon || Mount Lemmon Survey || — || align=right data-sort-value="0.88" | 880 m || 
|-id=382 bgcolor=#E9E9E9
| 404382 ||  || — || November 17, 2006 || Mount Lemmon || Mount Lemmon Survey || HOF || align=right | 2.8 km || 
|-id=383 bgcolor=#E9E9E9
| 404383 ||  || — || January 24, 2004 || Socorro || LINEAR || — || align=right | 1.3 km || 
|-id=384 bgcolor=#E9E9E9
| 404384 ||  || — || March 17, 2004 || Kitt Peak || Spacewatch || — || align=right | 2.9 km || 
|-id=385 bgcolor=#fefefe
| 404385 ||  || — || September 21, 2011 || Kitt Peak || Spacewatch || — || align=right data-sort-value="0.77" | 770 m || 
|-id=386 bgcolor=#E9E9E9
| 404386 ||  || — || March 19, 2009 || Mount Lemmon || Mount Lemmon Survey || — || align=right | 1.7 km || 
|-id=387 bgcolor=#d6d6d6
| 404387 ||  || — || October 24, 2005 || Kitt Peak || Spacewatch || — || align=right | 2.6 km || 
|-id=388 bgcolor=#E9E9E9
| 404388 ||  || — || November 22, 2006 || Kitt Peak || Spacewatch || AGN || align=right | 1.1 km || 
|-id=389 bgcolor=#E9E9E9
| 404389 ||  || — || November 7, 2007 || Kitt Peak || Spacewatch || — || align=right | 1.2 km || 
|-id=390 bgcolor=#fefefe
| 404390 ||  || — || January 31, 2009 || Kitt Peak || Spacewatch || — || align=right | 1.1 km || 
|-id=391 bgcolor=#E9E9E9
| 404391 ||  || — || January 14, 2008 || Kitt Peak || Spacewatch || — || align=right | 1.9 km || 
|-id=392 bgcolor=#E9E9E9
| 404392 ||  || — || February 9, 2008 || Kitt Peak || Spacewatch || AGN || align=right | 1.2 km || 
|-id=393 bgcolor=#E9E9E9
| 404393 ||  || — || October 22, 2006 || Kitt Peak || Spacewatch || PAD || align=right | 1.7 km || 
|-id=394 bgcolor=#E9E9E9
| 404394 ||  || — || December 17, 2007 || Mount Lemmon || Mount Lemmon Survey || — || align=right | 1.1 km || 
|-id=395 bgcolor=#d6d6d6
| 404395 ||  || — || October 1, 2005 || Kitt Peak || Spacewatch || KOR || align=right | 1.3 km || 
|-id=396 bgcolor=#d6d6d6
| 404396 ||  || — || January 3, 2012 || Kitt Peak || Spacewatch || — || align=right | 2.5 km || 
|-id=397 bgcolor=#d6d6d6
| 404397 ||  || — || November 10, 2010 || Mount Lemmon || Mount Lemmon Survey || — || align=right | 2.6 km || 
|-id=398 bgcolor=#E9E9E9
| 404398 ||  || — || February 9, 2008 || Kitt Peak || Spacewatch || — || align=right | 1.4 km || 
|-id=399 bgcolor=#E9E9E9
| 404399 ||  || — || August 28, 2005 || Kitt Peak || Spacewatch || — || align=right | 1.9 km || 
|-id=400 bgcolor=#d6d6d6
| 404400 ||  || — || September 27, 2009 || Mount Lemmon || Mount Lemmon Survey || — || align=right | 2.8 km || 
|}

404401–404500 

|-bgcolor=#E9E9E9
| 404401 ||  || — || February 9, 2008 || Mount Lemmon || Mount Lemmon Survey || MRX || align=right | 1.2 km || 
|-id=402 bgcolor=#E9E9E9
| 404402 ||  || — || September 16, 2001 || Socorro || LINEAR || — || align=right | 2.1 km || 
|-id=403 bgcolor=#E9E9E9
| 404403 ||  || — || March 26, 2004 || Kitt Peak || Spacewatch || — || align=right | 1.9 km || 
|-id=404 bgcolor=#fefefe
| 404404 ||  || — || October 9, 2004 || Kitt Peak || Spacewatch || — || align=right data-sort-value="0.93" | 930 m || 
|-id=405 bgcolor=#fefefe
| 404405 ||  || — || October 17, 1995 || Kitt Peak || Spacewatch || — || align=right | 1.1 km || 
|-id=406 bgcolor=#E9E9E9
| 404406 ||  || — || May 3, 2005 || Kitt Peak || Spacewatch || — || align=right data-sort-value="0.85" | 850 m || 
|-id=407 bgcolor=#E9E9E9
| 404407 ||  || — || October 20, 2007 || Mount Lemmon || Mount Lemmon Survey || — || align=right data-sort-value="0.94" | 940 m || 
|-id=408 bgcolor=#d6d6d6
| 404408 ||  || — || March 7, 2013 || Kitt Peak || Spacewatch || THM || align=right | 2.2 km || 
|-id=409 bgcolor=#E9E9E9
| 404409 ||  || — || January 13, 2008 || Kitt Peak || Spacewatch ||  || align=right | 1.7 km || 
|-id=410 bgcolor=#E9E9E9
| 404410 ||  || — || November 13, 2007 || Kitt Peak || Spacewatch || — || align=right data-sort-value="0.91" | 910 m || 
|-id=411 bgcolor=#fefefe
| 404411 ||  || — || September 10, 2004 || Kitt Peak || Spacewatch || — || align=right data-sort-value="0.70" | 700 m || 
|-id=412 bgcolor=#fefefe
| 404412 ||  || — || January 15, 2005 || Kitt Peak || Spacewatch || NYS || align=right data-sort-value="0.72" | 720 m || 
|-id=413 bgcolor=#d6d6d6
| 404413 ||  || — || May 4, 2008 || Kitt Peak || Spacewatch || — || align=right | 2.1 km || 
|-id=414 bgcolor=#E9E9E9
| 404414 ||  || — || April 20, 2004 || Socorro || LINEAR || — || align=right | 2.6 km || 
|-id=415 bgcolor=#d6d6d6
| 404415 ||  || — || October 7, 2004 || Kitt Peak || Spacewatch || — || align=right | 3.3 km || 
|-id=416 bgcolor=#d6d6d6
| 404416 ||  || — || December 22, 2005 || Kitt Peak || Spacewatch || — || align=right | 2.9 km || 
|-id=417 bgcolor=#E9E9E9
| 404417 ||  || — || February 29, 2008 || Mount Lemmon || Mount Lemmon Survey || — || align=right | 1.6 km || 
|-id=418 bgcolor=#fefefe
| 404418 ||  || — || September 16, 2004 || Kitt Peak || Spacewatch || — || align=right data-sort-value="0.98" | 980 m || 
|-id=419 bgcolor=#d6d6d6
| 404419 ||  || — || March 15, 2007 || Mount Lemmon || Mount Lemmon Survey || — || align=right | 2.9 km || 
|-id=420 bgcolor=#d6d6d6
| 404420 ||  || — || January 30, 2012 || Kitt Peak || Spacewatch || — || align=right | 3.2 km || 
|-id=421 bgcolor=#E9E9E9
| 404421 ||  || — || March 4, 2008 || Mount Lemmon || Mount Lemmon Survey || — || align=right | 3.0 km || 
|-id=422 bgcolor=#d6d6d6
| 404422 ||  || — || December 25, 2005 || Mount Lemmon || Mount Lemmon Survey || — || align=right | 3.6 km || 
|-id=423 bgcolor=#E9E9E9
| 404423 ||  || — || May 19, 2005 || Mount Lemmon || Mount Lemmon Survey || — || align=right | 1.3 km || 
|-id=424 bgcolor=#E9E9E9
| 404424 ||  || — || May 20, 2005 || Mount Lemmon || Mount Lemmon Survey || — || align=right | 1.2 km || 
|-id=425 bgcolor=#E9E9E9
| 404425 ||  || — || October 3, 2006 || Mount Lemmon || Mount Lemmon Survey || — || align=right | 1.6 km || 
|-id=426 bgcolor=#d6d6d6
| 404426 ||  || — || August 8, 2004 || Socorro || LINEAR || — || align=right | 3.6 km || 
|-id=427 bgcolor=#E9E9E9
| 404427 ||  || — || March 5, 2000 || Socorro || LINEAR || — || align=right | 1.7 km || 
|-id=428 bgcolor=#E9E9E9
| 404428 ||  || — || May 28, 2010 || WISE || WISE || KON || align=right | 3.6 km || 
|-id=429 bgcolor=#E9E9E9
| 404429 ||  || — || February 8, 2008 || Mount Lemmon || Mount Lemmon Survey || — || align=right | 2.3 km || 
|-id=430 bgcolor=#d6d6d6
| 404430 ||  || — || November 10, 2010 || Mount Lemmon || Mount Lemmon Survey || THM || align=right | 2.6 km || 
|-id=431 bgcolor=#E9E9E9
| 404431 ||  || — || March 16, 2004 || Kitt Peak || Spacewatch || — || align=right | 2.7 km || 
|-id=432 bgcolor=#E9E9E9
| 404432 ||  || — || October 13, 2006 || Kitt Peak || Spacewatch || — || align=right | 1.8 km || 
|-id=433 bgcolor=#d6d6d6
| 404433 ||  || — || January 10, 2007 || Kitt Peak || Spacewatch || — || align=right | 3.0 km || 
|-id=434 bgcolor=#fefefe
| 404434 ||  || — || December 18, 2004 || Mount Lemmon || Mount Lemmon Survey || V || align=right data-sort-value="0.87" | 870 m || 
|-id=435 bgcolor=#d6d6d6
| 404435 ||  || — || November 10, 2010 || Mount Lemmon || Mount Lemmon Survey || HYG || align=right | 3.2 km || 
|-id=436 bgcolor=#d6d6d6
| 404436 ||  || — || March 20, 1996 || Kitt Peak || Spacewatch || — || align=right | 3.4 km || 
|-id=437 bgcolor=#fefefe
| 404437 ||  || — || September 13, 2007 || Mount Lemmon || Mount Lemmon Survey || V || align=right data-sort-value="0.68" | 680 m || 
|-id=438 bgcolor=#d6d6d6
| 404438 ||  || — || January 27, 2007 || Mount Lemmon || Mount Lemmon Survey || — || align=right | 2.5 km || 
|-id=439 bgcolor=#fefefe
| 404439 ||  || — || October 8, 2007 || Mount Lemmon || Mount Lemmon Survey || — || align=right data-sort-value="0.92" | 920 m || 
|-id=440 bgcolor=#E9E9E9
| 404440 ||  || — || October 29, 2010 || Catalina || CSS || — || align=right | 3.3 km || 
|-id=441 bgcolor=#d6d6d6
| 404441 ||  || — || October 24, 2005 || Kitt Peak || Spacewatch || — || align=right | 2.3 km || 
|-id=442 bgcolor=#d6d6d6
| 404442 ||  || — || November 17, 2004 || Siding Spring || SSS || — || align=right | 3.6 km || 
|-id=443 bgcolor=#E9E9E9
| 404443 ||  || — || May 15, 2009 || Kitt Peak || Spacewatch || — || align=right | 1.7 km || 
|-id=444 bgcolor=#E9E9E9
| 404444 ||  || — || August 13, 2010 || Kitt Peak || Spacewatch || — || align=right | 1.5 km || 
|-id=445 bgcolor=#E9E9E9
| 404445 ||  || — || April 16, 2005 || Kitt Peak || Spacewatch || — || align=right data-sort-value="0.96" | 960 m || 
|-id=446 bgcolor=#fefefe
| 404446 ||  || — || June 18, 1998 || Kitt Peak || Spacewatch || — || align=right | 1.1 km || 
|-id=447 bgcolor=#fefefe
| 404447 ||  || — || September 30, 2011 || Kitt Peak || Spacewatch || — || align=right data-sort-value="0.82" | 820 m || 
|-id=448 bgcolor=#E9E9E9
| 404448 ||  || — || December 20, 2007 || Mount Lemmon || Mount Lemmon Survey || — || align=right | 1.4 km || 
|-id=449 bgcolor=#fefefe
| 404449 ||  || — || February 1, 2005 || Catalina || CSS || — || align=right | 1.1 km || 
|-id=450 bgcolor=#fefefe
| 404450 ||  || — || September 12, 2007 || Mount Lemmon || Mount Lemmon Survey || — || align=right data-sort-value="0.92" | 920 m || 
|-id=451 bgcolor=#fefefe
| 404451 ||  || — || February 19, 2009 || Mount Lemmon || Mount Lemmon Survey || — || align=right data-sort-value="0.86" | 860 m || 
|-id=452 bgcolor=#d6d6d6
| 404452 ||  || — || May 11, 2002 || Socorro || LINEAR || — || align=right | 3.3 km || 
|-id=453 bgcolor=#fefefe
| 404453 ||  || — || March 11, 2005 || Kitt Peak || Spacewatch || — || align=right | 1.5 km || 
|-id=454 bgcolor=#d6d6d6
| 404454 ||  || — || December 1, 2010 || Mount Lemmon || Mount Lemmon Survey || — || align=right | 3.3 km || 
|-id=455 bgcolor=#E9E9E9
| 404455 ||  || — || May 16, 2005 || Mount Lemmon || Mount Lemmon Survey || — || align=right | 1.1 km || 
|-id=456 bgcolor=#E9E9E9
| 404456 ||  || — || April 2, 2005 || Kitt Peak || Spacewatch || — || align=right | 1.0 km || 
|-id=457 bgcolor=#fefefe
| 404457 ||  || — || January 30, 2009 || Mount Lemmon || Mount Lemmon Survey || — || align=right | 2.4 km || 
|-id=458 bgcolor=#d6d6d6
| 404458 ||  || — || November 7, 2010 || Mount Lemmon || Mount Lemmon Survey || — || align=right | 3.0 km || 
|-id=459 bgcolor=#E9E9E9
| 404459 ||  || — || March 16, 2004 || Kitt Peak || Spacewatch || — || align=right | 1.6 km || 
|-id=460 bgcolor=#d6d6d6
| 404460 ||  || — || April 7, 2008 || Kitt Peak || Spacewatch || — || align=right | 2.5 km || 
|-id=461 bgcolor=#E9E9E9
| 404461 ||  || — || April 13, 2004 || Kitt Peak || Spacewatch || — || align=right | 2.4 km || 
|-id=462 bgcolor=#fefefe
| 404462 ||  || — || November 4, 2007 || Mount Lemmon || Mount Lemmon Survey || — || align=right data-sort-value="0.94" | 940 m || 
|-id=463 bgcolor=#E9E9E9
| 404463 ||  || — || September 25, 2006 || Kitt Peak || Spacewatch || — || align=right | 1.4 km || 
|-id=464 bgcolor=#d6d6d6
| 404464 ||  || — || November 13, 2010 || Kitt Peak || Spacewatch || — || align=right | 2.9 km || 
|-id=465 bgcolor=#fefefe
| 404465 ||  || — || September 11, 2007 || Mount Lemmon || Mount Lemmon Survey || — || align=right data-sort-value="0.77" | 770 m || 
|-id=466 bgcolor=#d6d6d6
| 404466 ||  || — || October 17, 2010 || Mount Lemmon || Mount Lemmon Survey || KOR || align=right | 1.3 km || 
|-id=467 bgcolor=#E9E9E9
| 404467 ||  || — || February 9, 2008 || Kitt Peak || Spacewatch || — || align=right | 1.8 km || 
|-id=468 bgcolor=#d6d6d6
| 404468 ||  || — || October 7, 2004 || Kitt Peak || Spacewatch || — || align=right | 3.2 km || 
|-id=469 bgcolor=#d6d6d6
| 404469 ||  || — || October 11, 1996 || Kitt Peak || Spacewatch || — || align=right | 2.1 km || 
|-id=470 bgcolor=#E9E9E9
| 404470 ||  || — || April 2, 2009 || Mount Lemmon || Mount Lemmon Survey || — || align=right | 2.0 km || 
|-id=471 bgcolor=#fefefe
| 404471 ||  || — || November 23, 2008 || Kitt Peak || Spacewatch || — || align=right data-sort-value="0.88" | 880 m || 
|-id=472 bgcolor=#d6d6d6
| 404472 ||  || — || January 25, 2006 || Kitt Peak || Spacewatch || — || align=right | 4.2 km || 
|-id=473 bgcolor=#E9E9E9
| 404473 ||  || — || November 19, 2006 || Kitt Peak || Spacewatch || AGN || align=right | 1.3 km || 
|-id=474 bgcolor=#E9E9E9
| 404474 ||  || — || May 13, 2004 || Kitt Peak || Spacewatch || — || align=right | 2.7 km || 
|-id=475 bgcolor=#d6d6d6
| 404475 ||  || — || November 2, 2010 || Kitt Peak || Spacewatch || — || align=right | 3.3 km || 
|-id=476 bgcolor=#E9E9E9
| 404476 ||  || — || March 31, 2004 || Kitt Peak || Spacewatch || — || align=right | 2.1 km || 
|-id=477 bgcolor=#d6d6d6
| 404477 ||  || — || November 25, 2005 || Kitt Peak || Spacewatch || — || align=right | 3.0 km || 
|-id=478 bgcolor=#d6d6d6
| 404478 ||  || — || March 10, 2007 || Kitt Peak || Spacewatch || — || align=right | 3.8 km || 
|-id=479 bgcolor=#d6d6d6
| 404479 ||  || — || June 8, 1997 || Kitt Peak || Spacewatch || — || align=right | 3.1 km || 
|-id=480 bgcolor=#E9E9E9
| 404480 ||  || — || May 14, 2004 || Socorro || LINEAR || — || align=right | 3.2 km || 
|-id=481 bgcolor=#E9E9E9
| 404481 ||  || — || January 19, 2008 || Mount Lemmon || Mount Lemmon Survey || — || align=right | 2.3 km || 
|-id=482 bgcolor=#fefefe
| 404482 ||  || — || February 2, 2009 || Kitt Peak || Spacewatch || — || align=right | 1.1 km || 
|-id=483 bgcolor=#E9E9E9
| 404483 ||  || — || February 3, 2008 || Kitt Peak || Spacewatch || — || align=right | 2.1 km || 
|-id=484 bgcolor=#d6d6d6
| 404484 ||  || — || March 10, 2007 || Mount Lemmon || Mount Lemmon Survey || — || align=right | 2.8 km || 
|-id=485 bgcolor=#d6d6d6
| 404485 ||  || — || November 1, 2005 || Mount Lemmon || Mount Lemmon Survey || — || align=right | 3.2 km || 
|-id=486 bgcolor=#E9E9E9
| 404486 ||  || — || November 4, 2007 || Mount Lemmon || Mount Lemmon Survey || — || align=right | 2.0 km || 
|-id=487 bgcolor=#d6d6d6
| 404487 ||  || — || September 23, 2009 || Mount Lemmon || Mount Lemmon Survey || — || align=right | 3.1 km || 
|-id=488 bgcolor=#d6d6d6
| 404488 ||  || — || January 1, 2012 || Mount Lemmon || Mount Lemmon Survey || — || align=right | 3.3 km || 
|-id=489 bgcolor=#fefefe
| 404489 ||  || — || February 22, 2006 || Mount Lemmon || Mount Lemmon Survey || (2076) || align=right data-sort-value="0.92" | 920 m || 
|-id=490 bgcolor=#E9E9E9
| 404490 ||  || — || January 31, 2000 || Socorro || LINEAR || — || align=right | 1.4 km || 
|-id=491 bgcolor=#E9E9E9
| 404491 ||  || — || September 17, 2006 || Kitt Peak || Spacewatch || — || align=right | 1.1 km || 
|-id=492 bgcolor=#d6d6d6
| 404492 ||  || — || February 10, 2008 || Mount Lemmon || Mount Lemmon Survey || EOS || align=right | 2.3 km || 
|-id=493 bgcolor=#E9E9E9
| 404493 ||  || — || March 11, 2005 || Mount Lemmon || Mount Lemmon Survey || — || align=right | 1.2 km || 
|-id=494 bgcolor=#E9E9E9
| 404494 ||  || — || March 15, 2005 || Mount Lemmon || Mount Lemmon Survey || — || align=right | 1.1 km || 
|-id=495 bgcolor=#d6d6d6
| 404495 ||  || — || October 17, 2010 || Mount Lemmon || Mount Lemmon Survey || — || align=right | 3.1 km || 
|-id=496 bgcolor=#d6d6d6
| 404496 ||  || — || December 5, 2005 || Kitt Peak || Spacewatch || EOS || align=right | 2.2 km || 
|-id=497 bgcolor=#E9E9E9
| 404497 ||  || — || October 16, 1996 || Kitt Peak || Spacewatch || — || align=right | 2.0 km || 
|-id=498 bgcolor=#fefefe
| 404498 ||  || — || October 11, 2007 || Kitt Peak || Spacewatch || — || align=right data-sort-value="0.94" | 940 m || 
|-id=499 bgcolor=#E9E9E9
| 404499 ||  || — || November 1, 2006 || Mount Lemmon || Mount Lemmon Survey || — || align=right | 1.7 km || 
|-id=500 bgcolor=#fefefe
| 404500 ||  || — || January 13, 2005 || Catalina || CSS || — || align=right data-sort-value="0.81" | 810 m || 
|}

404501–404600 

|-bgcolor=#E9E9E9
| 404501 ||  || — || August 28, 2005 || Kitt Peak || Spacewatch || — || align=right | 1.8 km || 
|-id=502 bgcolor=#E9E9E9
| 404502 ||  || — || February 11, 2008 || Kitt Peak || Spacewatch || — || align=right | 1.9 km || 
|-id=503 bgcolor=#d6d6d6
| 404503 ||  || — || December 15, 2006 || Kitt Peak || Spacewatch || — || align=right | 2.5 km || 
|-id=504 bgcolor=#E9E9E9
| 404504 ||  || — || January 2, 2012 || Mount Lemmon || Mount Lemmon Survey || — || align=right | 1.4 km || 
|-id=505 bgcolor=#d6d6d6
| 404505 ||  || — || November 13, 2010 || Mount Lemmon || Mount Lemmon Survey || — || align=right | 2.2 km || 
|-id=506 bgcolor=#d6d6d6
| 404506 ||  || — || March 2, 1997 || Kitt Peak || Spacewatch || — || align=right | 2.4 km || 
|-id=507 bgcolor=#d6d6d6
| 404507 ||  || — || September 15, 2009 || Kitt Peak || Spacewatch || — || align=right | 2.8 km || 
|-id=508 bgcolor=#E9E9E9
| 404508 ||  || — || March 13, 2008 || Mount Lemmon || Mount Lemmon Survey || AGN || align=right | 1.1 km || 
|-id=509 bgcolor=#E9E9E9
| 404509 ||  || — || October 25, 1997 || Caussols || ODAS || — || align=right | 2.4 km || 
|-id=510 bgcolor=#fefefe
| 404510 ||  || — || August 19, 2006 || Kitt Peak || Spacewatch || — || align=right data-sort-value="0.99" | 990 m || 
|-id=511 bgcolor=#d6d6d6
| 404511 ||  || — || October 26, 2005 || Kitt Peak || Spacewatch || — || align=right | 2.1 km || 
|-id=512 bgcolor=#E9E9E9
| 404512 ||  || — || August 28, 2006 || Kitt Peak || Spacewatch || — || align=right | 1.7 km || 
|-id=513 bgcolor=#E9E9E9
| 404513 ||  || — || September 27, 2006 || Mount Lemmon || Mount Lemmon Survey || — || align=right | 1.4 km || 
|-id=514 bgcolor=#d6d6d6
| 404514 ||  || — || October 4, 2004 || Kitt Peak || Spacewatch || — || align=right | 3.6 km || 
|-id=515 bgcolor=#E9E9E9
| 404515 ||  || — || September 28, 1994 || Kitt Peak || Spacewatch || — || align=right | 1.1 km || 
|-id=516 bgcolor=#d6d6d6
| 404516 ||  || — || February 6, 2007 || Mount Lemmon || Mount Lemmon Survey || — || align=right | 2.2 km || 
|-id=517 bgcolor=#fefefe
| 404517 ||  || — || December 15, 2004 || Kitt Peak || Spacewatch || — || align=right data-sort-value="0.56" | 560 m || 
|-id=518 bgcolor=#d6d6d6
| 404518 ||  || — || November 13, 2010 || Mount Lemmon || Mount Lemmon Survey || — || align=right | 1.9 km || 
|-id=519 bgcolor=#E9E9E9
| 404519 ||  || — || April 2, 2005 || Mount Lemmon || Mount Lemmon Survey || — || align=right data-sort-value="0.85" | 850 m || 
|-id=520 bgcolor=#d6d6d6
| 404520 ||  || — || September 24, 2005 || Kitt Peak || Spacewatch || KOR || align=right | 1.2 km || 
|-id=521 bgcolor=#d6d6d6
| 404521 ||  || — || November 10, 2010 || Mount Lemmon || Mount Lemmon Survey || — || align=right | 1.9 km || 
|-id=522 bgcolor=#fefefe
| 404522 ||  || — || December 15, 2004 || Kitt Peak || Spacewatch || — || align=right data-sort-value="0.53" | 530 m || 
|-id=523 bgcolor=#fefefe
| 404523 ||  || — || September 10, 2007 || Mount Lemmon || Mount Lemmon Survey || MAS || align=right data-sort-value="0.68" | 680 m || 
|-id=524 bgcolor=#fefefe
| 404524 ||  || — || January 15, 2005 || Kitt Peak || Spacewatch || NYS || align=right data-sort-value="0.59" | 590 m || 
|-id=525 bgcolor=#fefefe
| 404525 ||  || — || October 7, 2004 || Kitt Peak || Spacewatch || — || align=right data-sort-value="0.65" | 650 m || 
|-id=526 bgcolor=#d6d6d6
| 404526 ||  || — || November 25, 2005 || Kitt Peak || Spacewatch || — || align=right | 3.1 km || 
|-id=527 bgcolor=#E9E9E9
| 404527 ||  || — || February 3, 2008 || Kitt Peak || Spacewatch || — || align=right | 1.7 km || 
|-id=528 bgcolor=#d6d6d6
| 404528 ||  || — || November 4, 2010 || Mount Lemmon || Mount Lemmon Survey || — || align=right | 2.3 km || 
|-id=529 bgcolor=#E9E9E9
| 404529 ||  || — || September 4, 2010 || Kitt Peak || Spacewatch || — || align=right | 1.5 km || 
|-id=530 bgcolor=#E9E9E9
| 404530 ||  || — || January 28, 2003 || Kitt Peak || Spacewatch || — || align=right | 2.3 km || 
|-id=531 bgcolor=#E9E9E9
| 404531 ||  || — || September 28, 2001 || Palomar || NEAT || — || align=right | 1.3 km || 
|-id=532 bgcolor=#E9E9E9
| 404532 ||  || — || January 14, 2008 || Kitt Peak || Spacewatch || — || align=right data-sort-value="0.94" | 940 m || 
|-id=533 bgcolor=#fefefe
| 404533 ||  || — || October 14, 2007 || Mount Lemmon || Mount Lemmon Survey || V || align=right data-sort-value="0.56" | 560 m || 
|-id=534 bgcolor=#d6d6d6
| 404534 ||  || — || April 7, 2008 || Mount Lemmon || Mount Lemmon Survey || KOR || align=right | 1.0 km || 
|-id=535 bgcolor=#d6d6d6
| 404535 ||  || — || February 16, 2001 || Kitt Peak || Spacewatch || THM || align=right | 2.0 km || 
|-id=536 bgcolor=#E9E9E9
| 404536 ||  || — || December 6, 2007 || Kitt Peak || Spacewatch || — || align=right | 1.4 km || 
|-id=537 bgcolor=#d6d6d6
| 404537 ||  || — || October 19, 2010 || Mount Lemmon || Mount Lemmon Survey || BRA || align=right | 2.1 km || 
|-id=538 bgcolor=#d6d6d6
| 404538 ||  || — || October 16, 2009 || Catalina || CSS || — || align=right | 3.6 km || 
|-id=539 bgcolor=#d6d6d6
| 404539 ||  || — || October 7, 2004 || Kitt Peak || Spacewatch || HYG || align=right | 2.7 km || 
|-id=540 bgcolor=#d6d6d6
| 404540 ||  || — || August 21, 2004 || Siding Spring || SSS || — || align=right | 3.1 km || 
|-id=541 bgcolor=#d6d6d6
| 404541 ||  || — || December 27, 2005 || Kitt Peak || Spacewatch || EOS || align=right | 2.4 km || 
|-id=542 bgcolor=#E9E9E9
| 404542 ||  || — || October 12, 2010 || Mount Lemmon || Mount Lemmon Survey || — || align=right | 2.4 km || 
|-id=543 bgcolor=#d6d6d6
| 404543 ||  || — || March 12, 2002 || Kitt Peak || Spacewatch || — || align=right | 2.2 km || 
|-id=544 bgcolor=#E9E9E9
| 404544 ||  || — || May 28, 2009 || Mount Lemmon || Mount Lemmon Survey || — || align=right | 1.0 km || 
|-id=545 bgcolor=#d6d6d6
| 404545 ||  || — || January 10, 2006 || Mount Lemmon || Mount Lemmon Survey || — || align=right | 3.0 km || 
|-id=546 bgcolor=#d6d6d6
| 404546 ||  || — || September 27, 2003 || Kitt Peak || Spacewatch || — || align=right | 3.1 km || 
|-id=547 bgcolor=#d6d6d6
| 404547 ||  || — || November 8, 1996 || Kitt Peak || Spacewatch || BRA || align=right | 1.6 km || 
|-id=548 bgcolor=#d6d6d6
| 404548 ||  || — || February 17, 2007 || Kitt Peak || Spacewatch || — || align=right | 2.6 km || 
|-id=549 bgcolor=#d6d6d6
| 404549 ||  || — || February 8, 2007 || Kitt Peak || Spacewatch || KOR || align=right | 1.4 km || 
|-id=550 bgcolor=#d6d6d6
| 404550 ||  || — || February 24, 2006 || Mount Lemmon || Mount Lemmon Survey || EOS || align=right | 2.3 km || 
|-id=551 bgcolor=#d6d6d6
| 404551 ||  || — || November 27, 2011 || Mount Lemmon || Mount Lemmon Survey || TIR || align=right | 3.4 km || 
|-id=552 bgcolor=#d6d6d6
| 404552 ||  || — || November 21, 2009 || Catalina || CSS || — || align=right | 4.8 km || 
|-id=553 bgcolor=#d6d6d6
| 404553 ||  || — || January 8, 2006 || Mount Lemmon || Mount Lemmon Survey || — || align=right | 3.6 km || 
|-id=554 bgcolor=#d6d6d6
| 404554 ||  || — || April 15, 2007 || Mount Lemmon || Mount Lemmon Survey || — || align=right | 3.7 km || 
|-id=555 bgcolor=#d6d6d6
| 404555 ||  || — || December 29, 2005 || Kitt Peak || Spacewatch || — || align=right | 3.7 km || 
|-id=556 bgcolor=#d6d6d6
| 404556 ||  || — || April 4, 2003 || Kitt Peak || Spacewatch || — || align=right | 2.5 km || 
|-id=557 bgcolor=#E9E9E9
| 404557 ||  || — || January 4, 2012 || Kitt Peak || Spacewatch || — || align=right | 1.8 km || 
|-id=558 bgcolor=#d6d6d6
| 404558 ||  || — || September 15, 2009 || Kitt Peak || Spacewatch || — || align=right | 3.0 km || 
|-id=559 bgcolor=#d6d6d6
| 404559 ||  || — || February 6, 2007 || Mount Lemmon || Mount Lemmon Survey || — || align=right | 2.7 km || 
|-id=560 bgcolor=#E9E9E9
| 404560 ||  || — || November 17, 2006 || Kitt Peak || Spacewatch || — || align=right | 1.7 km || 
|-id=561 bgcolor=#d6d6d6
| 404561 ||  || — || October 7, 2004 || Kitt Peak || Spacewatch || — || align=right | 3.0 km || 
|-id=562 bgcolor=#d6d6d6
| 404562 ||  || — || May 3, 2008 || Kitt Peak || Spacewatch || — || align=right | 2.5 km || 
|-id=563 bgcolor=#d6d6d6
| 404563 ||  || — || October 13, 2004 || Kitt Peak || Spacewatch || ARM || align=right | 4.4 km || 
|-id=564 bgcolor=#d6d6d6
| 404564 ||  || — || May 11, 1996 || Kitt Peak || Spacewatch || — || align=right | 3.4 km || 
|-id=565 bgcolor=#E9E9E9
| 404565 ||  || — || August 28, 2005 || Kitt Peak || Spacewatch || — || align=right | 1.9 km || 
|-id=566 bgcolor=#d6d6d6
| 404566 ||  || — || December 25, 2005 || Kitt Peak || Spacewatch || THM || align=right | 2.5 km || 
|-id=567 bgcolor=#E9E9E9
| 404567 ||  || — || June 17, 2010 || WISE || WISE || — || align=right | 2.7 km || 
|-id=568 bgcolor=#d6d6d6
| 404568 ||  || — || February 16, 2001 || Kitt Peak || Spacewatch || EOS || align=right | 1.9 km || 
|-id=569 bgcolor=#d6d6d6
| 404569 ||  || — || January 22, 2006 || Mount Lemmon || Mount Lemmon Survey || — || align=right | 2.5 km || 
|-id=570 bgcolor=#d6d6d6
| 404570 ||  || — || October 13, 2004 || Kitt Peak || Spacewatch || — || align=right | 2.6 km || 
|-id=571 bgcolor=#d6d6d6
| 404571 ||  || — || May 29, 2008 || Mount Lemmon || Mount Lemmon Survey || — || align=right | 3.2 km || 
|-id=572 bgcolor=#d6d6d6
| 404572 ||  || — || October 9, 2004 || Kitt Peak || Spacewatch || — || align=right | 2.9 km || 
|-id=573 bgcolor=#d6d6d6
| 404573 ||  || — || November 1, 2005 || Kitt Peak || Spacewatch || — || align=right | 2.7 km || 
|-id=574 bgcolor=#fefefe
| 404574 ||  || — || March 3, 2005 || Catalina || CSS || — || align=right data-sort-value="0.86" | 860 m || 
|-id=575 bgcolor=#E9E9E9
| 404575 ||  || — || January 10, 2007 || Mount Lemmon || Mount Lemmon Survey || GEF || align=right | 1.5 km || 
|-id=576 bgcolor=#d6d6d6
| 404576 ||  || — || February 23, 2007 || Kitt Peak || Spacewatch || — || align=right | 2.7 km || 
|-id=577 bgcolor=#d6d6d6
| 404577 ||  || — || November 10, 2004 || Kitt Peak || Spacewatch || — || align=right | 3.2 km || 
|-id=578 bgcolor=#d6d6d6
| 404578 ||  || — || February 25, 2007 || Mount Lemmon || Mount Lemmon Survey || — || align=right | 2.5 km || 
|-id=579 bgcolor=#d6d6d6
| 404579 ||  || — || April 26, 2007 || Kitt Peak || Spacewatch || — || align=right | 3.0 km || 
|-id=580 bgcolor=#d6d6d6
| 404580 ||  || — || December 2, 2005 || Kitt Peak || Spacewatch || LIX || align=right | 4.3 km || 
|-id=581 bgcolor=#d6d6d6
| 404581 ||  || — || January 31, 2006 || Kitt Peak || Spacewatch || — || align=right | 3.0 km || 
|-id=582 bgcolor=#d6d6d6
| 404582 ||  || — || December 8, 2005 || Kitt Peak || Spacewatch || — || align=right | 2.8 km || 
|-id=583 bgcolor=#E9E9E9
| 404583 ||  || — || August 13, 2010 || Kitt Peak || Spacewatch || — || align=right | 1.2 km || 
|-id=584 bgcolor=#d6d6d6
| 404584 ||  || — || January 21, 2012 || Haleakala || Pan-STARRS || — || align=right | 4.0 km || 
|-id=585 bgcolor=#d6d6d6
| 404585 ||  || — || September 16, 2009 || Catalina || CSS || — || align=right | 4.3 km || 
|-id=586 bgcolor=#d6d6d6
| 404586 ||  || — || December 26, 2011 || Mount Lemmon || Mount Lemmon Survey || — || align=right | 2.9 km || 
|-id=587 bgcolor=#d6d6d6
| 404587 ||  || — || March 14, 2007 || Mount Lemmon || Mount Lemmon Survey || — || align=right | 3.0 km || 
|-id=588 bgcolor=#d6d6d6
| 404588 ||  || — || February 26, 2010 || WISE || WISE || ULA7:4 || align=right | 6.1 km || 
|-id=589 bgcolor=#d6d6d6
| 404589 ||  || — || February 1, 2000 || Kitt Peak || Spacewatch || — || align=right | 3.4 km || 
|-id=590 bgcolor=#d6d6d6
| 404590 ||  || — || April 15, 2007 || Mount Lemmon || Mount Lemmon Survey || — || align=right | 3.2 km || 
|-id=591 bgcolor=#d6d6d6
| 404591 ||  || — || December 27, 2005 || Kitt Peak || Spacewatch || — || align=right | 3.5 km || 
|-id=592 bgcolor=#d6d6d6
| 404592 ||  || — || February 26, 2007 || Mount Lemmon || Mount Lemmon Survey || — || align=right | 3.2 km || 
|-id=593 bgcolor=#d6d6d6
| 404593 ||  || — || April 19, 2007 || Kitt Peak || Spacewatch || — || align=right | 3.4 km || 
|-id=594 bgcolor=#d6d6d6
| 404594 ||  || — || December 14, 1993 || Kitt Peak || Spacewatch || — || align=right | 3.4 km || 
|-id=595 bgcolor=#fefefe
| 404595 ||  || — || November 3, 2000 || Kitt Peak || Spacewatch || — || align=right data-sort-value="0.68" | 680 m || 
|-id=596 bgcolor=#d6d6d6
| 404596 ||  || — || November 15, 1998 || Kitt Peak || Spacewatch || — || align=right | 3.5 km || 
|-id=597 bgcolor=#d6d6d6
| 404597 ||  || — || January 29, 2000 || Kitt Peak || Spacewatch || — || align=right | 3.2 km || 
|-id=598 bgcolor=#E9E9E9
| 404598 ||  || — || April 1, 2008 || Kitt Peak || Spacewatch || — || align=right | 1.2 km || 
|-id=599 bgcolor=#E9E9E9
| 404599 ||  || — || November 2, 2000 || Kitt Peak || Spacewatch || — || align=right | 1.6 km || 
|-id=600 bgcolor=#fefefe
| 404600 ||  || — || October 12, 1998 || Kitt Peak || Spacewatch || — || align=right data-sort-value="0.88" | 880 m || 
|}

404601–404700 

|-bgcolor=#fefefe
| 404601 ||  || — || November 16, 2006 || Mount Lemmon || Mount Lemmon Survey || — || align=right | 1.0 km || 
|-id=602 bgcolor=#fefefe
| 404602 ||  || — || December 12, 1999 || Socorro || LINEAR || — || align=right data-sort-value="0.85" | 850 m || 
|-id=603 bgcolor=#d6d6d6
| 404603 ||  || — || June 26, 2011 || Mount Lemmon || Mount Lemmon Survey || — || align=right | 3.6 km || 
|-id=604 bgcolor=#E9E9E9
| 404604 ||  || — || October 23, 2003 || Anderson Mesa || LONEOS || — || align=right | 3.0 km || 
|-id=605 bgcolor=#d6d6d6
| 404605 ||  || — || April 4, 2003 || Kitt Peak || Spacewatch || — || align=right | 3.7 km || 
|-id=606 bgcolor=#E9E9E9
| 404606 ||  || — || April 11, 2005 || Mount Lemmon || Mount Lemmon Survey || AGN || align=right | 1.5 km || 
|-id=607 bgcolor=#d6d6d6
| 404607 ||  || — || November 6, 1996 || Kitt Peak || Spacewatch || — || align=right | 3.2 km || 
|-id=608 bgcolor=#fefefe
| 404608 ||  || — || October 25, 2005 || Catalina || CSS || — || align=right data-sort-value="0.99" | 990 m || 
|-id=609 bgcolor=#E9E9E9
| 404609 ||  || — || October 21, 2003 || Kitt Peak || Spacewatch || — || align=right | 3.2 km || 
|-id=610 bgcolor=#fefefe
| 404610 ||  || — || February 22, 2003 || Kitt Peak || Spacewatch || NYS || align=right data-sort-value="0.60" | 600 m || 
|-id=611 bgcolor=#E9E9E9
| 404611 ||  || — || March 23, 2006 || Mount Lemmon || Mount Lemmon Survey || — || align=right | 1.4 km || 
|-id=612 bgcolor=#d6d6d6
| 404612 ||  || — || April 7, 1997 || Kitt Peak || Spacewatch || — || align=right | 3.1 km || 
|-id=613 bgcolor=#E9E9E9
| 404613 ||  || — || March 13, 2005 || Mount Lemmon || Mount Lemmon Survey || — || align=right | 2.5 km || 
|-id=614 bgcolor=#d6d6d6
| 404614 ||  || — || April 11, 2003 || Kitt Peak || Spacewatch || VER || align=right | 2.9 km || 
|-id=615 bgcolor=#E9E9E9
| 404615 ||  || — || November 3, 1999 || Kitt Peak || Spacewatch || — || align=right data-sort-value="0.95" | 950 m || 
|-id=616 bgcolor=#d6d6d6
| 404616 ||  || — || October 9, 2005 || Kitt Peak || Spacewatch || — || align=right | 2.3 km || 
|-id=617 bgcolor=#fefefe
| 404617 ||  || — || September 7, 2004 || Kitt Peak || Spacewatch || — || align=right | 1.00 km || 
|-id=618 bgcolor=#d6d6d6
| 404618 ||  || — || February 10, 2008 || Catalina || CSS || — || align=right | 4.2 km || 
|-id=619 bgcolor=#fefefe
| 404619 ||  || — || April 30, 2003 || Kitt Peak || Spacewatch || V || align=right data-sort-value="0.68" | 680 m || 
|-id=620 bgcolor=#d6d6d6
| 404620 ||  || — || December 3, 2007 || Kitt Peak || Spacewatch || — || align=right | 2.7 km || 
|-id=621 bgcolor=#E9E9E9
| 404621 ||  || — || May 11, 2010 || Kitt Peak || Spacewatch || — || align=right data-sort-value="0.95" | 950 m || 
|-id=622 bgcolor=#d6d6d6
| 404622 ||  || — || October 12, 2005 || Kitt Peak || Spacewatch || — || align=right | 2.9 km || 
|-id=623 bgcolor=#E9E9E9
| 404623 ||  || — || October 10, 2012 || Kitt Peak || Spacewatch || — || align=right | 1.9 km || 
|-id=624 bgcolor=#d6d6d6
| 404624 ||  || — || January 16, 2013 || Mount Lemmon || Mount Lemmon Survey || — || align=right | 3.4 km || 
|-id=625 bgcolor=#fefefe
| 404625 ||  || — || February 24, 2006 || Mount Lemmon || Mount Lemmon Survey || H || align=right data-sort-value="0.71" | 710 m || 
|-id=626 bgcolor=#E9E9E9
| 404626 ||  || — || November 19, 2007 || Mount Lemmon || Mount Lemmon Survey || — || align=right | 1.9 km || 
|-id=627 bgcolor=#fefefe
| 404627 ||  || — || July 15, 2007 || Siding Spring || SSS || — || align=right | 1.1 km || 
|-id=628 bgcolor=#E9E9E9
| 404628 ||  || — || May 11, 2010 || Kitt Peak || Spacewatch || — || align=right | 1.6 km || 
|-id=629 bgcolor=#fefefe
| 404629 ||  || — || February 10, 2002 || Socorro || LINEAR || — || align=right data-sort-value="0.95" | 950 m || 
|-id=630 bgcolor=#fefefe
| 404630 ||  || — || May 10, 2003 || Kitt Peak || Spacewatch || — || align=right data-sort-value="0.94" | 940 m || 
|-id=631 bgcolor=#FA8072
| 404631 ||  || — || November 16, 2001 || Kitt Peak || Spacewatch || — || align=right data-sort-value="0.91" | 910 m || 
|-id=632 bgcolor=#d6d6d6
| 404632 ||  || — || February 10, 2002 || Socorro || LINEAR || — || align=right | 3.4 km || 
|-id=633 bgcolor=#d6d6d6
| 404633 ||  || — || November 14, 2006 || Kitt Peak || Spacewatch || — || align=right | 2.3 km || 
|-id=634 bgcolor=#d6d6d6
| 404634 ||  || — || November 20, 2006 || Kitt Peak || Spacewatch || EOS || align=right | 1.7 km || 
|-id=635 bgcolor=#d6d6d6
| 404635 ||  || — || March 23, 2006 || Kitt Peak || Spacewatch || SHU3:2 || align=right | 6.7 km || 
|-id=636 bgcolor=#fefefe
| 404636 ||  || — || May 25, 2007 || Mount Lemmon || Mount Lemmon Survey || MAS || align=right data-sort-value="0.75" | 750 m || 
|-id=637 bgcolor=#E9E9E9
| 404637 ||  || — || May 11, 2005 || Mount Lemmon || Mount Lemmon Survey || PAD || align=right | 1.6 km || 
|-id=638 bgcolor=#fefefe
| 404638 ||  || — || September 24, 2000 || Socorro || LINEAR || MAS || align=right data-sort-value="0.90" | 900 m || 
|-id=639 bgcolor=#fefefe
| 404639 ||  || — || February 1, 2003 || Kitt Peak || Spacewatch || — || align=right data-sort-value="0.82" | 820 m || 
|-id=640 bgcolor=#fefefe
| 404640 ||  || — || March 11, 1996 || Kitt Peak || Spacewatch || — || align=right data-sort-value="0.67" | 670 m || 
|-id=641 bgcolor=#E9E9E9
| 404641 ||  || — || March 3, 1997 || Kitt Peak || Spacewatch || — || align=right data-sort-value="0.98" | 980 m || 
|-id=642 bgcolor=#E9E9E9
| 404642 ||  || — || March 9, 2005 || Catalina || CSS || ADE || align=right | 2.1 km || 
|-id=643 bgcolor=#d6d6d6
| 404643 ||  || — || October 28, 2005 || Mount Lemmon || Mount Lemmon Survey || — || align=right | 2.5 km || 
|-id=644 bgcolor=#fefefe
| 404644 ||  || — || October 25, 2005 || Mount Lemmon || Mount Lemmon Survey || NYS || align=right data-sort-value="0.54" | 540 m || 
|-id=645 bgcolor=#fefefe
| 404645 ||  || — || November 26, 1994 || Kitt Peak || Spacewatch || V || align=right data-sort-value="0.85" | 850 m || 
|-id=646 bgcolor=#E9E9E9
| 404646 ||  || — || November 8, 2007 || Kitt Peak || Spacewatch || — || align=right | 1.7 km || 
|-id=647 bgcolor=#d6d6d6
| 404647 ||  || — || May 2, 2009 || Mount Lemmon || Mount Lemmon Survey || — || align=right | 2.9 km || 
|-id=648 bgcolor=#d6d6d6
| 404648 ||  || — || June 3, 2009 || Mount Lemmon || Mount Lemmon Survey || — || align=right | 2.4 km || 
|-id=649 bgcolor=#d6d6d6
| 404649 ||  || — || August 28, 2005 || Kitt Peak || Spacewatch || EOS || align=right | 1.8 km || 
|-id=650 bgcolor=#E9E9E9
| 404650 ||  || — || February 3, 2009 || Kitt Peak || Spacewatch || — || align=right | 1.3 km || 
|-id=651 bgcolor=#fefefe
| 404651 ||  || — || April 3, 2000 || Anderson Mesa || LONEOS || — || align=right data-sort-value="0.87" | 870 m || 
|-id=652 bgcolor=#fefefe
| 404652 ||  || — || April 19, 2004 || Kitt Peak || Spacewatch || — || align=right data-sort-value="0.65" | 650 m || 
|-id=653 bgcolor=#d6d6d6
| 404653 ||  || — || May 3, 2006 || Mount Lemmon || Mount Lemmon Survey || 3:2 || align=right | 4.0 km || 
|-id=654 bgcolor=#d6d6d6
| 404654 ||  || — || March 10, 2003 || Campo Imperatore || CINEOS || TIR || align=right | 2.8 km || 
|-id=655 bgcolor=#d6d6d6
| 404655 ||  || — || September 26, 2006 || Kitt Peak || Spacewatch || — || align=right | 2.2 km || 
|-id=656 bgcolor=#E9E9E9
| 404656 ||  || — || September 20, 2007 || Kitt Peak || Spacewatch || — || align=right | 1.6 km || 
|-id=657 bgcolor=#d6d6d6
| 404657 ||  || — || November 18, 2006 || Mount Lemmon || Mount Lemmon Survey || — || align=right | 3.2 km || 
|-id=658 bgcolor=#E9E9E9
| 404658 ||  || — || November 14, 1999 || Kitt Peak || Spacewatch || — || align=right data-sort-value="0.97" | 970 m || 
|-id=659 bgcolor=#E9E9E9
| 404659 ||  || — || November 18, 2003 || Kitt Peak || Spacewatch || MAR || align=right data-sort-value="0.95" | 950 m || 
|-id=660 bgcolor=#fefefe
| 404660 ||  || — || October 1, 2008 || Mount Lemmon || Mount Lemmon Survey || — || align=right data-sort-value="0.88" | 880 m || 
|-id=661 bgcolor=#E9E9E9
| 404661 ||  || — || October 30, 2011 || Mount Lemmon || Mount Lemmon Survey || EUN || align=right | 1.5 km || 
|-id=662 bgcolor=#fefefe
| 404662 ||  || — || June 4, 2006 || Mount Lemmon || Mount Lemmon Survey || H || align=right data-sort-value="0.88" | 880 m || 
|-id=663 bgcolor=#E9E9E9
| 404663 ||  || — || March 3, 2005 || Catalina || CSS || ADE || align=right | 2.5 km || 
|-id=664 bgcolor=#d6d6d6
| 404664 ||  || — || September 18, 2006 || Kitt Peak || Spacewatch || KOR || align=right | 1.2 km || 
|-id=665 bgcolor=#d6d6d6
| 404665 ||  || — || March 17, 2009 || Kitt Peak || Spacewatch || — || align=right | 3.0 km || 
|-id=666 bgcolor=#fefefe
| 404666 ||  || — || February 21, 2006 || Anderson Mesa || LONEOS || — || align=right data-sort-value="0.93" | 930 m || 
|-id=667 bgcolor=#fefefe
| 404667 ||  || — || January 15, 2010 || Kitt Peak || Spacewatch || NYS || align=right data-sort-value="0.57" | 570 m || 
|-id=668 bgcolor=#E9E9E9
| 404668 ||  || — || June 23, 2007 || Kitt Peak || Spacewatch || — || align=right | 1.1 km || 
|-id=669 bgcolor=#d6d6d6
| 404669 ||  || — || October 24, 2005 || Kitt Peak || Spacewatch || — || align=right | 2.5 km || 
|-id=670 bgcolor=#FA8072
| 404670 ||  || — || August 31, 2005 || Kitt Peak || Spacewatch || — || align=right data-sort-value="0.40" | 400 m || 
|-id=671 bgcolor=#fefefe
| 404671 ||  || — || October 9, 2005 || Kitt Peak || Spacewatch || — || align=right | 1.8 km || 
|-id=672 bgcolor=#d6d6d6
| 404672 ||  || — || October 30, 2005 || Kitt Peak || Spacewatch || THM || align=right | 2.6 km || 
|-id=673 bgcolor=#E9E9E9
| 404673 ||  || — || January 28, 2004 || Kitt Peak || Spacewatch || — || align=right | 2.0 km || 
|-id=674 bgcolor=#d6d6d6
| 404674 ||  || — || December 21, 2006 || Kitt Peak || Spacewatch || — || align=right | 4.0 km || 
|-id=675 bgcolor=#fefefe
| 404675 ||  || — || December 26, 2005 || Mount Lemmon || Mount Lemmon Survey || — || align=right data-sort-value="0.95" | 950 m || 
|-id=676 bgcolor=#d6d6d6
| 404676 ||  || — || December 17, 2000 || Kitt Peak || Spacewatch || — || align=right | 3.8 km || 
|-id=677 bgcolor=#E9E9E9
| 404677 ||  || — || March 9, 2005 || Anderson Mesa || LONEOS || — || align=right | 3.1 km || 
|-id=678 bgcolor=#d6d6d6
| 404678 ||  || — || March 6, 1999 || Kitt Peak || Spacewatch || BRA || align=right | 1.7 km || 
|-id=679 bgcolor=#E9E9E9
| 404679 ||  || — || April 30, 2006 || Kitt Peak || Spacewatch || — || align=right data-sort-value="0.84" | 840 m || 
|-id=680 bgcolor=#fefefe
| 404680 ||  || — || February 1, 2006 || Mount Lemmon || Mount Lemmon Survey || — || align=right data-sort-value="0.67" | 670 m || 
|-id=681 bgcolor=#d6d6d6
| 404681 ||  || — || February 28, 2008 || Kitt Peak || Spacewatch || EOS || align=right | 1.9 km || 
|-id=682 bgcolor=#E9E9E9
| 404682 ||  || — || April 9, 2005 || Kitt Peak || Spacewatch || JUN || align=right | 1.2 km || 
|-id=683 bgcolor=#C2FFFF
| 404683 ||  || — || January 5, 2000 || Kitt Peak || Spacewatch || L4 || align=right | 8.5 km || 
|-id=684 bgcolor=#fefefe
| 404684 ||  || — || December 26, 2005 || Kitt Peak || Spacewatch || — || align=right | 1.0 km || 
|-id=685 bgcolor=#d6d6d6
| 404685 ||  || — || May 11, 2003 || Kitt Peak || Spacewatch || VER || align=right | 3.0 km || 
|-id=686 bgcolor=#d6d6d6
| 404686 ||  || — || October 27, 2005 || Anderson Mesa || LONEOS || EOS || align=right | 2.6 km || 
|-id=687 bgcolor=#E9E9E9
| 404687 ||  || — || March 24, 2001 || Anderson Mesa || LONEOS || — || align=right | 2.2 km || 
|-id=688 bgcolor=#fefefe
| 404688 ||  || — || February 20, 2010 || Kitt Peak || Spacewatch || NYS || align=right data-sort-value="0.59" | 590 m || 
|-id=689 bgcolor=#E9E9E9
| 404689 ||  || — || April 30, 2000 || Socorro || LINEAR || — || align=right | 2.3 km || 
|-id=690 bgcolor=#fefefe
| 404690 ||  || — || April 14, 2004 || Kitt Peak || Spacewatch || — || align=right data-sort-value="0.79" | 790 m || 
|-id=691 bgcolor=#d6d6d6
| 404691 ||  || — || June 14, 2009 || Kitt Peak || Spacewatch || — || align=right | 2.9 km || 
|-id=692 bgcolor=#d6d6d6
| 404692 ||  || — || April 15, 2008 || Mount Lemmon || Mount Lemmon Survey || — || align=right | 3.0 km || 
|-id=693 bgcolor=#d6d6d6
| 404693 ||  || — || October 13, 1999 || Socorro || LINEAR || ELF || align=right | 4.2 km || 
|-id=694 bgcolor=#E9E9E9
| 404694 ||  || — || December 19, 2004 || Mount Lemmon || Mount Lemmon Survey || — || align=right | 1.3 km || 
|-id=695 bgcolor=#d6d6d6
| 404695 ||  || — || July 29, 2004 || Siding Spring || SSS || — || align=right | 3.4 km || 
|-id=696 bgcolor=#E9E9E9
| 404696 ||  || — || April 9, 2005 || Kitt Peak || Spacewatch || — || align=right | 1.9 km || 
|-id=697 bgcolor=#fefefe
| 404697 ||  || — || January 31, 2006 || Kitt Peak || Spacewatch || MAS || align=right data-sort-value="0.81" | 810 m || 
|-id=698 bgcolor=#fefefe
| 404698 ||  || — || May 15, 2007 || Mount Lemmon || Mount Lemmon Survey || V || align=right data-sort-value="0.71" | 710 m || 
|-id=699 bgcolor=#fefefe
| 404699 ||  || — || December 14, 2001 || Socorro || LINEAR || — || align=right data-sort-value="0.90" | 900 m || 
|-id=700 bgcolor=#d6d6d6
| 404700 ||  || — || April 30, 1997 || Kitt Peak || Spacewatch || — || align=right | 3.7 km || 
|}

404701–404800 

|-bgcolor=#E9E9E9
| 404701 ||  || — || January 15, 2005 || Kitt Peak || Spacewatch || — || align=right | 1.5 km || 
|-id=702 bgcolor=#fefefe
| 404702 ||  || — || April 26, 2006 || Catalina || CSS || H || align=right data-sort-value="0.60" | 600 m || 
|-id=703 bgcolor=#fefefe
| 404703 ||  || — || January 30, 2006 || Kitt Peak || Spacewatch || NYS || align=right data-sort-value="0.74" | 740 m || 
|-id=704 bgcolor=#fefefe
| 404704 ||  || — || December 19, 2009 || Mount Lemmon || Mount Lemmon Survey || (2076) || align=right data-sort-value="0.77" | 770 m || 
|-id=705 bgcolor=#d6d6d6
| 404705 ||  || — || January 10, 2007 || Kitt Peak || Spacewatch || — || align=right | 4.0 km || 
|-id=706 bgcolor=#E9E9E9
| 404706 ||  || — || November 8, 2007 || Mount Lemmon || Mount Lemmon Survey || — || align=right | 2.1 km || 
|-id=707 bgcolor=#E9E9E9
| 404707 ||  || — || May 19, 2010 || Mount Lemmon || Mount Lemmon Survey || — || align=right data-sort-value="0.93" | 930 m || 
|-id=708 bgcolor=#E9E9E9
| 404708 ||  || — || May 18, 2001 || Socorro || LINEAR || JUN || align=right | 1.4 km || 
|-id=709 bgcolor=#fefefe
| 404709 ||  || — || February 27, 2006 || Kitt Peak || Spacewatch || NYS || align=right data-sort-value="0.64" | 640 m || 
|-id=710 bgcolor=#E9E9E9
| 404710 ||  || — || January 25, 2009 || Kitt Peak || Spacewatch || — || align=right | 1.2 km || 
|-id=711 bgcolor=#E9E9E9
| 404711 ||  || — || May 8, 2005 || Mount Lemmon || Mount Lemmon Survey || WIT || align=right | 1.4 km || 
|-id=712 bgcolor=#d6d6d6
| 404712 ||  || — || July 12, 2010 || WISE || WISE || — || align=right | 2.9 km || 
|-id=713 bgcolor=#d6d6d6
| 404713 ||  || — || October 1, 2005 || Kitt Peak || Spacewatch || — || align=right | 2.6 km || 
|-id=714 bgcolor=#fefefe
| 404714 ||  || — || February 15, 2010 || Catalina || CSS || — || align=right data-sort-value="0.65" | 650 m || 
|-id=715 bgcolor=#E9E9E9
| 404715 ||  || — || December 22, 2008 || Kitt Peak || Spacewatch || — || align=right data-sort-value="0.89" | 890 m || 
|-id=716 bgcolor=#d6d6d6
| 404716 ||  || — || October 29, 2005 || Mount Lemmon || Mount Lemmon Survey || — || align=right | 4.0 km || 
|-id=717 bgcolor=#E9E9E9
| 404717 ||  || — || April 21, 2006 || Kitt Peak || Spacewatch || — || align=right data-sort-value="0.77" | 770 m || 
|-id=718 bgcolor=#E9E9E9
| 404718 ||  || — || March 17, 2004 || Kitt Peak || Spacewatch || — || align=right | 2.8 km || 
|-id=719 bgcolor=#E9E9E9
| 404719 ||  || — || December 10, 2004 || Kitt Peak || Spacewatch || — || align=right data-sort-value="0.91" | 910 m || 
|-id=720 bgcolor=#E9E9E9
| 404720 ||  || — || November 19, 2008 || Mount Lemmon || Mount Lemmon Survey || — || align=right | 1.1 km || 
|-id=721 bgcolor=#fefefe
| 404721 ||  || — || October 2, 2008 || Kitt Peak || Spacewatch || — || align=right data-sort-value="0.91" | 910 m || 
|-id=722 bgcolor=#fefefe
| 404722 ||  || — || October 7, 2004 || Socorro || LINEAR || — || align=right data-sort-value="0.94" | 940 m || 
|-id=723 bgcolor=#d6d6d6
| 404723 ||  || — || October 26, 2005 || Kitt Peak || Spacewatch || — || align=right | 4.2 km || 
|-id=724 bgcolor=#fefefe
| 404724 ||  || — || February 19, 2002 || Kitt Peak || Spacewatch || — || align=right data-sort-value="0.84" | 840 m || 
|-id=725 bgcolor=#d6d6d6
| 404725 ||  || — || December 18, 2001 || Socorro || LINEAR || — || align=right | 3.2 km || 
|-id=726 bgcolor=#d6d6d6
| 404726 ||  || — || February 28, 2008 || Kitt Peak || Spacewatch || — || align=right | 2.9 km || 
|-id=727 bgcolor=#fefefe
| 404727 ||  || — || August 24, 2007 || Kitt Peak || Spacewatch || — || align=right data-sort-value="0.75" | 750 m || 
|-id=728 bgcolor=#d6d6d6
| 404728 ||  || — || April 13, 2004 || Kitt Peak || Spacewatch || KOR || align=right | 1.6 km || 
|-id=729 bgcolor=#d6d6d6
| 404729 ||  || — || October 7, 2005 || Anderson Mesa || LONEOS || — || align=right | 3.8 km || 
|-id=730 bgcolor=#E9E9E9
| 404730 ||  || — || September 23, 2006 || Kitt Peak || Spacewatch || — || align=right | 1.6 km || 
|-id=731 bgcolor=#fefefe
| 404731 ||  || — || March 10, 2007 || Kitt Peak || Spacewatch || — || align=right data-sort-value="0.72" | 720 m || 
|-id=732 bgcolor=#E9E9E9
| 404732 ||  || — || September 12, 2007 || Mount Lemmon || Mount Lemmon Survey || — || align=right | 1.1 km || 
|-id=733 bgcolor=#fefefe
| 404733 ||  || — || January 12, 2002 || Kitt Peak || Spacewatch || — || align=right | 1.0 km || 
|-id=734 bgcolor=#E9E9E9
| 404734 ||  || — || January 29, 2009 || Catalina || CSS || EUN || align=right | 1.6 km || 
|-id=735 bgcolor=#d6d6d6
| 404735 ||  || — || November 28, 1994 || Kitt Peak || Spacewatch || — || align=right | 3.9 km || 
|-id=736 bgcolor=#fefefe
| 404736 ||  || — || December 16, 2004 || Kitt Peak || Spacewatch || — || align=right | 1.2 km || 
|-id=737 bgcolor=#fefefe
| 404737 ||  || — || December 31, 2007 || Mount Lemmon || Mount Lemmon Survey || H || align=right data-sort-value="0.98" | 980 m || 
|-id=738 bgcolor=#d6d6d6
| 404738 ||  || — || November 17, 2006 || Mount Lemmon || Mount Lemmon Survey || Tj (2.98) || align=right | 2.9 km || 
|-id=739 bgcolor=#fefefe
| 404739 ||  || — || December 20, 2004 || Mount Lemmon || Mount Lemmon Survey || — || align=right | 3.7 km || 
|-id=740 bgcolor=#E9E9E9
| 404740 ||  || — || December 21, 2008 || Catalina || CSS || — || align=right | 2.5 km || 
|-id=741 bgcolor=#d6d6d6
| 404741 ||  || — || December 4, 2005 || Kitt Peak || Spacewatch || — || align=right | 4.0 km || 
|-id=742 bgcolor=#d6d6d6
| 404742 ||  || — || June 21, 2009 || Mount Lemmon || Mount Lemmon Survey || — || align=right | 3.7 km || 
|-id=743 bgcolor=#E9E9E9
| 404743 ||  || — || May 2, 2006 || Kitt Peak || Spacewatch || — || align=right | 1.5 km || 
|-id=744 bgcolor=#fefefe
| 404744 ||  || — || May 4, 2006 || Catalina || CSS || H || align=right | 1.0 km || 
|-id=745 bgcolor=#d6d6d6
| 404745 ||  || — || October 27, 2005 || Anderson Mesa || LONEOS || EOS || align=right | 2.6 km || 
|-id=746 bgcolor=#d6d6d6
| 404746 ||  || — || October 26, 2005 || Kitt Peak || Spacewatch || — || align=right | 3.3 km || 
|-id=747 bgcolor=#E9E9E9
| 404747 ||  || — || February 28, 2009 || Kitt Peak || Spacewatch || — || align=right | 1.9 km || 
|-id=748 bgcolor=#E9E9E9
| 404748 ||  || — || March 11, 2005 || Mount Lemmon || Mount Lemmon Survey || — || align=right | 1.6 km || 
|-id=749 bgcolor=#fefefe
| 404749 ||  || — || April 14, 2007 || Mount Lemmon || Mount Lemmon Survey || — || align=right data-sort-value="0.81" | 810 m || 
|-id=750 bgcolor=#d6d6d6
| 404750 ||  || — || October 4, 2004 || Kitt Peak || Spacewatch || — || align=right | 2.8 km || 
|-id=751 bgcolor=#fefefe
| 404751 ||  || — || December 28, 2005 || Kitt Peak || Spacewatch || — || align=right data-sort-value="0.84" | 840 m || 
|-id=752 bgcolor=#E9E9E9
| 404752 ||  || — || November 8, 2007 || Mount Lemmon || Mount Lemmon Survey || GEF || align=right | 1.3 km || 
|-id=753 bgcolor=#d6d6d6
| 404753 ||  || — || March 31, 2008 || Mount Lemmon || Mount Lemmon Survey || — || align=right | 2.4 km || 
|-id=754 bgcolor=#fefefe
| 404754 ||  || — || November 25, 2005 || Mount Lemmon || Mount Lemmon Survey || — || align=right data-sort-value="0.67" | 670 m || 
|-id=755 bgcolor=#E9E9E9
| 404755 ||  || — || October 10, 2007 || Kitt Peak || Spacewatch || — || align=right | 1.1 km || 
|-id=756 bgcolor=#E9E9E9
| 404756 ||  || — || September 27, 2006 || Kitt Peak || Spacewatch || HOF || align=right | 2.9 km || 
|-id=757 bgcolor=#E9E9E9
| 404757 ||  || — || June 18, 2010 || Mount Lemmon || Mount Lemmon Survey || — || align=right | 2.1 km || 
|-id=758 bgcolor=#E9E9E9
| 404758 ||  || — || October 15, 2007 || Mount Lemmon || Mount Lemmon Survey || — || align=right data-sort-value="0.83" | 830 m || 
|-id=759 bgcolor=#d6d6d6
| 404759 ||  || — || December 13, 2006 || Kitt Peak || Spacewatch || — || align=right | 3.4 km || 
|-id=760 bgcolor=#fefefe
| 404760 ||  || — || April 11, 1996 || Kitt Peak || Spacewatch || — || align=right data-sort-value="0.97" | 970 m || 
|-id=761 bgcolor=#fefefe
| 404761 ||  || — || November 20, 2008 || Kitt Peak || Spacewatch || — || align=right data-sort-value="0.82" | 820 m || 
|-id=762 bgcolor=#fefefe
| 404762 ||  || — || June 13, 2007 || Kitt Peak || Spacewatch || V || align=right data-sort-value="0.71" | 710 m || 
|-id=763 bgcolor=#E9E9E9
| 404763 ||  || — || November 20, 2007 || Kitt Peak || Spacewatch || — || align=right | 1.3 km || 
|-id=764 bgcolor=#E9E9E9
| 404764 ||  || — || September 15, 2006 || Kitt Peak || Spacewatch || — || align=right | 2.2 km || 
|-id=765 bgcolor=#d6d6d6
| 404765 ||  || — || January 9, 2007 || Kitt Peak || Spacewatch || EOS || align=right | 2.3 km || 
|-id=766 bgcolor=#fefefe
| 404766 ||  || — || May 8, 2010 || WISE || WISE || — || align=right data-sort-value="0.83" | 830 m || 
|-id=767 bgcolor=#d6d6d6
| 404767 ||  || — || November 17, 2006 || Mount Lemmon || Mount Lemmon Survey || — || align=right | 3.2 km || 
|-id=768 bgcolor=#fefefe
| 404768 ||  || — || February 17, 2010 || Kitt Peak || Spacewatch || — || align=right data-sort-value="0.70" | 700 m || 
|-id=769 bgcolor=#fefefe
| 404769 ||  || — || January 13, 1996 || Kitt Peak || Spacewatch || — || align=right | 1.6 km || 
|-id=770 bgcolor=#E9E9E9
| 404770 ||  || — || December 13, 2004 || Kitt Peak || Spacewatch || — || align=right | 1.4 km || 
|-id=771 bgcolor=#E9E9E9
| 404771 ||  || — || May 26, 2000 || Anderson Mesa || LONEOS || — || align=right | 3.0 km || 
|-id=772 bgcolor=#d6d6d6
| 404772 ||  || — || December 7, 2005 || Kitt Peak || Spacewatch || — || align=right | 3.8 km || 
|-id=773 bgcolor=#d6d6d6
| 404773 ||  || — || March 7, 2008 || Catalina || CSS || — || align=right | 3.9 km || 
|-id=774 bgcolor=#E9E9E9
| 404774 ||  || — || April 26, 2006 || Kitt Peak || Spacewatch || — || align=right | 1.0 km || 
|-id=775 bgcolor=#d6d6d6
| 404775 ||  || — || October 26, 2005 || Kitt Peak || Spacewatch || — || align=right | 3.5 km || 
|-id=776 bgcolor=#fefefe
| 404776 ||  || — || September 27, 2008 || Mount Lemmon || Mount Lemmon Survey || — || align=right | 1.1 km || 
|-id=777 bgcolor=#E9E9E9
| 404777 ||  || — || November 16, 1995 || Kitt Peak || Spacewatch || — || align=right | 1.1 km || 
|-id=778 bgcolor=#E9E9E9
| 404778 ||  || — || November 30, 2011 || Catalina || CSS || KON || align=right | 2.5 km || 
|-id=779 bgcolor=#E9E9E9
| 404779 ||  || — || May 9, 2005 || Kitt Peak || Spacewatch || — || align=right | 1.9 km || 
|-id=780 bgcolor=#E9E9E9
| 404780 ||  || — || March 28, 2009 || Catalina || CSS || — || align=right | 3.3 km || 
|-id=781 bgcolor=#fefefe
| 404781 ||  || — || December 21, 2008 || Catalina || CSS || V || align=right data-sort-value="0.74" | 740 m || 
|-id=782 bgcolor=#fefefe
| 404782 ||  || — || January 27, 2007 || Mount Lemmon || Mount Lemmon Survey || — || align=right data-sort-value="0.91" | 910 m || 
|-id=783 bgcolor=#fefefe
| 404783 ||  || — || May 29, 2006 || Kitt Peak || Spacewatch || — || align=right | 1.2 km || 
|-id=784 bgcolor=#fefefe
| 404784 ||  || — || August 4, 2003 || Kitt Peak || Spacewatch || MAS || align=right data-sort-value="0.75" | 750 m || 
|-id=785 bgcolor=#fefefe
| 404785 ||  || — || November 4, 2005 || Mount Lemmon || Mount Lemmon Survey || — || align=right | 1.0 km || 
|-id=786 bgcolor=#fefefe
| 404786 ||  || — || May 5, 1997 || Socorro || LINEAR || — || align=right | 1.3 km || 
|-id=787 bgcolor=#fefefe
| 404787 ||  || — || September 13, 2004 || Kitt Peak || Spacewatch || critical || align=right data-sort-value="0.43" | 430 m || 
|-id=788 bgcolor=#d6d6d6
| 404788 ||  || — || February 29, 2008 || Mount Lemmon || Mount Lemmon Survey || — || align=right | 2.3 km || 
|-id=789 bgcolor=#d6d6d6
| 404789 ||  || — || April 25, 1998 || Kitt Peak || Spacewatch || — || align=right | 2.3 km || 
|-id=790 bgcolor=#d6d6d6
| 404790 ||  || — || March 11, 2008 || Mount Lemmon || Mount Lemmon Survey || — || align=right | 2.9 km || 
|-id=791 bgcolor=#fefefe
| 404791 ||  || — || November 7, 2007 || Mount Lemmon || Mount Lemmon Survey || H || align=right data-sort-value="0.90" | 900 m || 
|-id=792 bgcolor=#d6d6d6
| 404792 ||  || — || May 28, 2009 || Mount Lemmon || Mount Lemmon Survey || — || align=right | 2.9 km || 
|-id=793 bgcolor=#fefefe
| 404793 ||  || — || October 8, 2008 || Catalina || CSS || — || align=right data-sort-value="0.88" | 880 m || 
|-id=794 bgcolor=#d6d6d6
| 404794 ||  || — || October 20, 1995 || Kitt Peak || Spacewatch || — || align=right | 2.5 km || 
|-id=795 bgcolor=#d6d6d6
| 404795 ||  || — || April 28, 2009 || Kitt Peak || Spacewatch || — || align=right | 2.7 km || 
|-id=796 bgcolor=#d6d6d6
| 404796 ||  || — || March 30, 2008 || Catalina || CSS || — || align=right | 5.0 km || 
|-id=797 bgcolor=#fefefe
| 404797 ||  || — || May 12, 2010 || Mount Lemmon || Mount Lemmon Survey || — || align=right data-sort-value="0.82" | 820 m || 
|-id=798 bgcolor=#E9E9E9
| 404798 ||  || — || June 6, 2005 || Kitt Peak || Spacewatch || — || align=right | 2.6 km || 
|-id=799 bgcolor=#E9E9E9
| 404799 ||  || — || October 12, 2007 || Mount Lemmon || Mount Lemmon Survey || MAR || align=right | 1.4 km || 
|-id=800 bgcolor=#E9E9E9
| 404800 ||  || — || November 28, 2011 || Kitt Peak || Spacewatch || GEF || align=right | 1.3 km || 
|}

404801–404900 

|-bgcolor=#d6d6d6
| 404801 ||  || — || March 30, 2008 || Catalina || CSS || — || align=right | 4.0 km || 
|-id=802 bgcolor=#fefefe
| 404802 ||  || — || September 26, 1995 || Kitt Peak || Spacewatch || — || align=right | 2.5 km || 
|-id=803 bgcolor=#d6d6d6
| 404803 ||  || — || October 7, 2010 || Catalina || CSS || EOS || align=right | 1.8 km || 
|-id=804 bgcolor=#fefefe
| 404804 ||  || — || September 10, 2004 || Socorro || LINEAR || — || align=right data-sort-value="0.95" | 950 m || 
|-id=805 bgcolor=#E9E9E9
| 404805 ||  || — || September 27, 2006 || Kitt Peak || Spacewatch || — || align=right | 2.6 km || 
|-id=806 bgcolor=#d6d6d6
| 404806 ||  || — || June 14, 2010 || WISE || WISE || — || align=right | 4.9 km || 
|-id=807 bgcolor=#fefefe
| 404807 ||  || — || March 24, 2003 || Kitt Peak || Spacewatch || — || align=right data-sort-value="0.71" | 710 m || 
|-id=808 bgcolor=#fefefe
| 404808 ||  || — || March 13, 2010 || Kitt Peak || Spacewatch || MAS || align=right data-sort-value="0.79" | 790 m || 
|-id=809 bgcolor=#fefefe
| 404809 ||  || — || December 10, 2004 || Kitt Peak || Spacewatch || — || align=right | 1.2 km || 
|-id=810 bgcolor=#E9E9E9
| 404810 ||  || — || November 2, 2007 || Mount Lemmon || Mount Lemmon Survey || — || align=right | 1.0 km || 
|-id=811 bgcolor=#fefefe
| 404811 ||  || — || January 2, 2000 || Kitt Peak || Spacewatch || — || align=right data-sort-value="0.74" | 740 m || 
|-id=812 bgcolor=#d6d6d6
| 404812 ||  || — || November 22, 2006 || Mount Lemmon || Mount Lemmon Survey || EOS || align=right | 2.1 km || 
|-id=813 bgcolor=#E9E9E9
| 404813 ||  || — || September 11, 2007 || Mount Lemmon || Mount Lemmon Survey || — || align=right | 1.2 km || 
|-id=814 bgcolor=#fefefe
| 404814 ||  || — || March 23, 2003 || Kitt Peak || Spacewatch || NYS || align=right data-sort-value="0.77" | 770 m || 
|-id=815 bgcolor=#E9E9E9
| 404815 ||  || — || February 21, 2004 || Kitt Peak || Spacewatch ||  || align=right | 2.0 km || 
|-id=816 bgcolor=#E9E9E9
| 404816 ||  || — || May 22, 2001 || Kitt Peak || Spacewatch || — || align=right | 1.6 km || 
|-id=817 bgcolor=#fefefe
| 404817 ||  || — || February 13, 2010 || Mount Lemmon || Mount Lemmon Survey || MAS || align=right data-sort-value="0.65" | 650 m || 
|-id=818 bgcolor=#d6d6d6
| 404818 ||  || — || October 17, 2006 || Mount Lemmon || Mount Lemmon Survey || KOR || align=right | 1.6 km || 
|-id=819 bgcolor=#fefefe
| 404819 ||  || — || October 30, 2005 || Kitt Peak || Spacewatch || — || align=right | 1.9 km || 
|-id=820 bgcolor=#fefefe
| 404820 ||  || — || November 19, 2008 || Mount Lemmon || Mount Lemmon Survey || — || align=right data-sort-value="0.90" | 900 m || 
|-id=821 bgcolor=#E9E9E9
| 404821 ||  || — || September 25, 2006 || Kitt Peak || Spacewatch || AEO || align=right | 1.2 km || 
|-id=822 bgcolor=#E9E9E9
| 404822 ||  || — || November 16, 2003 || Kitt Peak || Spacewatch || — || align=right data-sort-value="0.98" | 980 m || 
|-id=823 bgcolor=#E9E9E9
| 404823 ||  || — || May 28, 2000 || Socorro || LINEAR || — || align=right | 3.3 km || 
|-id=824 bgcolor=#fefefe
| 404824 ||  || — || September 7, 2011 || Kitt Peak || Spacewatch || CLA || align=right | 1.6 km || 
|-id=825 bgcolor=#d6d6d6
| 404825 ||  || — || September 12, 2004 || Kitt Peak || Spacewatch || — || align=right | 3.3 km || 
|-id=826 bgcolor=#fefefe
| 404826 ||  || — || April 5, 2003 || Kitt Peak || Spacewatch || — || align=right data-sort-value="0.60" | 600 m || 
|-id=827 bgcolor=#d6d6d6
| 404827 ||  || — || October 17, 2010 || Mount Lemmon || Mount Lemmon Survey || — || align=right | 2.6 km || 
|-id=828 bgcolor=#fefefe
| 404828 ||  || — || June 11, 2007 || Siding Spring || SSS || — || align=right | 1.0 km || 
|-id=829 bgcolor=#E9E9E9
| 404829 ||  || — || November 3, 2007 || Kitt Peak || Spacewatch || — || align=right data-sort-value="0.76" | 760 m || 
|-id=830 bgcolor=#fefefe
| 404830 ||  || — || March 13, 2010 || Kitt Peak || Spacewatch || MAS || align=right data-sort-value="0.73" | 730 m || 
|-id=831 bgcolor=#fefefe
| 404831 ||  || — || January 30, 2006 || Kitt Peak || Spacewatch || NYS || align=right data-sort-value="0.65" | 650 m || 
|-id=832 bgcolor=#fefefe
| 404832 ||  || — || May 10, 2003 || Kitt Peak || Spacewatch || — || align=right | 2.9 km || 
|-id=833 bgcolor=#fefefe
| 404833 ||  || — || February 17, 2010 || Kitt Peak || Spacewatch || NYS || align=right data-sort-value="0.57" | 570 m || 
|-id=834 bgcolor=#fefefe
| 404834 ||  || — || October 28, 2008 || Kitt Peak || Spacewatch || — || align=right | 1.0 km || 
|-id=835 bgcolor=#fefefe
| 404835 ||  || — || October 28, 2005 || Kitt Peak || Spacewatch || — || align=right data-sort-value="0.59" | 590 m || 
|-id=836 bgcolor=#d6d6d6
| 404836 ||  || — || November 16, 2006 || Mount Lemmon || Mount Lemmon Survey || KOR || align=right | 1.6 km || 
|-id=837 bgcolor=#d6d6d6
| 404837 ||  || — || March 11, 2008 || Catalina || CSS || — || align=right | 5.9 km || 
|-id=838 bgcolor=#E9E9E9
| 404838 ||  || — || August 7, 2010 || XuYi || PMO NEO || — || align=right | 1.4 km || 
|-id=839 bgcolor=#d6d6d6
| 404839 ||  || — || June 13, 2010 || WISE || WISE || — || align=right | 3.2 km || 
|-id=840 bgcolor=#fefefe
| 404840 ||  || — || March 13, 2007 || Kitt Peak || Spacewatch || — || align=right data-sort-value="0.67" | 670 m || 
|-id=841 bgcolor=#d6d6d6
| 404841 ||  || — || May 23, 1998 || Kitt Peak || Spacewatch || EOS || align=right | 2.0 km || 
|-id=842 bgcolor=#E9E9E9
| 404842 ||  || — || June 15, 2005 || Kitt Peak || Spacewatch || — || align=right | 2.3 km || 
|-id=843 bgcolor=#fefefe
| 404843 ||  || — || April 28, 2003 || Kitt Peak || Spacewatch || MAS || align=right data-sort-value="0.90" | 900 m || 
|-id=844 bgcolor=#E9E9E9
| 404844 ||  || — || November 18, 2003 || Kitt Peak || Spacewatch || MAR || align=right data-sort-value="0.99" | 990 m || 
|-id=845 bgcolor=#fefefe
| 404845 ||  || — || April 8, 2003 || Kitt Peak || Spacewatch || — || align=right data-sort-value="0.80" | 800 m || 
|-id=846 bgcolor=#fefefe
| 404846 ||  || — || March 26, 2003 || Kitt Peak || Spacewatch || — || align=right data-sort-value="0.77" | 770 m || 
|-id=847 bgcolor=#d6d6d6
| 404847 ||  || — || March 29, 2008 || Kitt Peak || Spacewatch || THM || align=right | 3.0 km || 
|-id=848 bgcolor=#E9E9E9
| 404848 ||  || — || February 28, 2009 || Kitt Peak || Spacewatch || AGN || align=right | 1.1 km || 
|-id=849 bgcolor=#d6d6d6
| 404849 ||  || — || February 8, 2008 || Siding Spring || SSS || — || align=right | 5.4 km || 
|-id=850 bgcolor=#d6d6d6
| 404850 ||  || — || August 30, 2005 || Kitt Peak || Spacewatch || — || align=right | 3.0 km || 
|-id=851 bgcolor=#fefefe
| 404851 ||  || — || October 22, 2005 || Kitt Peak || Spacewatch || — || align=right data-sort-value="0.75" | 750 m || 
|-id=852 bgcolor=#fefefe
| 404852 ||  || — || March 29, 2007 || Kitt Peak || Spacewatch || — || align=right data-sort-value="0.82" | 820 m || 
|-id=853 bgcolor=#d6d6d6
| 404853 ||  || — || September 12, 2010 || Mount Lemmon || Mount Lemmon Survey || — || align=right | 3.0 km || 
|-id=854 bgcolor=#E9E9E9
| 404854 ||  || — || August 29, 2006 || Catalina || CSS || — || align=right | 1.4 km || 
|-id=855 bgcolor=#d6d6d6
| 404855 ||  || — || April 30, 1997 || Socorro || LINEAR || — || align=right | 4.7 km || 
|-id=856 bgcolor=#d6d6d6
| 404856 ||  || — || October 29, 2005 || Kitt Peak || Spacewatch || — || align=right | 3.1 km || 
|-id=857 bgcolor=#d6d6d6
| 404857 ||  || — || March 26, 2009 || Mount Lemmon || Mount Lemmon Survey || — || align=right | 3.0 km || 
|-id=858 bgcolor=#fefefe
| 404858 ||  || — || May 26, 2003 || Kitt Peak || Spacewatch || V || align=right data-sort-value="0.68" | 680 m || 
|-id=859 bgcolor=#d6d6d6
| 404859 ||  || — || December 1, 2006 || Mount Lemmon || Mount Lemmon Survey || — || align=right | 3.8 km || 
|-id=860 bgcolor=#d6d6d6
| 404860 ||  || — || July 30, 2010 || WISE || WISE || — || align=right | 4.0 km || 
|-id=861 bgcolor=#E9E9E9
| 404861 ||  || — || February 4, 2009 || Mount Lemmon || Mount Lemmon Survey || ADE || align=right | 2.4 km || 
|-id=862 bgcolor=#fefefe
| 404862 ||  || — || February 25, 2006 || Kitt Peak || Spacewatch || — || align=right data-sort-value="0.88" | 880 m || 
|-id=863 bgcolor=#fefefe
| 404863 ||  || — || June 7, 2000 || Kitt Peak || Spacewatch || — || align=right data-sort-value="0.93" | 930 m || 
|-id=864 bgcolor=#d6d6d6
| 404864 ||  || — || January 27, 2007 || Kitt Peak || Spacewatch || EOS || align=right | 2.1 km || 
|-id=865 bgcolor=#E9E9E9
| 404865 ||  || — || December 31, 2008 || Catalina || CSS || — || align=right | 1.6 km || 
|-id=866 bgcolor=#d6d6d6
| 404866 ||  || — || May 26, 2003 || Kitt Peak || Spacewatch || EUP || align=right | 3.1 km || 
|-id=867 bgcolor=#fefefe
| 404867 ||  || — || April 19, 2007 || Mount Lemmon || Mount Lemmon Survey || V || align=right data-sort-value="0.72" | 720 m || 
|-id=868 bgcolor=#d6d6d6
| 404868 ||  || — || October 11, 2004 || Kitt Peak || Spacewatch || — || align=right | 2.7 km || 
|-id=869 bgcolor=#d6d6d6
| 404869 ||  || — || July 1, 2009 || Siding Spring || SSS || — || align=right | 4.4 km || 
|-id=870 bgcolor=#d6d6d6
| 404870 ||  || — || June 15, 2009 || Mount Lemmon || Mount Lemmon Survey || — || align=right | 4.1 km || 
|-id=871 bgcolor=#E9E9E9
| 404871 ||  || — || October 24, 2008 || Mount Lemmon || Mount Lemmon Survey || MAR || align=right | 1.1 km || 
|-id=872 bgcolor=#d6d6d6
| 404872 ||  || — || March 5, 2008 || Mount Lemmon || Mount Lemmon Survey || — || align=right | 2.4 km || 
|-id=873 bgcolor=#E9E9E9
| 404873 ||  || — || March 21, 2009 || Mount Lemmon || Mount Lemmon Survey || — || align=right | 1.8 km || 
|-id=874 bgcolor=#E9E9E9
| 404874 ||  || — || November 26, 2003 || Kitt Peak || Spacewatch || — || align=right | 1.4 km || 
|-id=875 bgcolor=#d6d6d6
| 404875 ||  || — || July 25, 2010 || WISE || WISE || — || align=right | 3.9 km || 
|-id=876 bgcolor=#E9E9E9
| 404876 ||  || — || June 24, 2000 || Kitt Peak || Spacewatch || — || align=right | 2.1 km || 
|-id=877 bgcolor=#fefefe
| 404877 ||  || — || February 7, 2002 || Socorro || LINEAR || — || align=right | 1.2 km || 
|-id=878 bgcolor=#fefefe
| 404878 ||  || — || September 26, 2000 || Socorro || LINEAR || — || align=right data-sort-value="0.97" | 970 m || 
|-id=879 bgcolor=#d6d6d6
| 404879 ||  || — || June 26, 2010 || WISE || WISE || — || align=right | 3.3 km || 
|-id=880 bgcolor=#d6d6d6
| 404880 ||  || — || November 1, 2005 || Catalina || CSS || EOS || align=right | 2.8 km || 
|-id=881 bgcolor=#fefefe
| 404881 ||  || — || April 17, 1996 || Kitt Peak || Spacewatch || — || align=right data-sort-value="0.84" | 840 m || 
|-id=882 bgcolor=#d6d6d6
| 404882 ||  || — || January 13, 2008 || Kitt Peak || Spacewatch || — || align=right | 2.6 km || 
|-id=883 bgcolor=#d6d6d6
| 404883 ||  || — || August 28, 2009 || Catalina || CSS || — || align=right | 3.1 km || 
|-id=884 bgcolor=#E9E9E9
| 404884 ||  || — || December 17, 2003 || Kitt Peak || Spacewatch || — || align=right | 1.9 km || 
|-id=885 bgcolor=#fefefe
| 404885 ||  || — || October 2, 2008 || Kitt Peak || Spacewatch || — || align=right data-sort-value="0.66" | 660 m || 
|-id=886 bgcolor=#d6d6d6
| 404886 ||  || — || January 19, 2002 || Kitt Peak || Spacewatch || EOS || align=right | 1.7 km || 
|-id=887 bgcolor=#E9E9E9
| 404887 ||  || — || September 17, 2006 || Kitt Peak || Spacewatch || — || align=right | 2.0 km || 
|-id=888 bgcolor=#d6d6d6
| 404888 ||  || — || March 11, 2008 || Kitt Peak || Spacewatch || — || align=right | 3.2 km || 
|-id=889 bgcolor=#E9E9E9
| 404889 ||  || — || September 27, 2006 || Catalina || CSS || — || align=right | 1.8 km || 
|-id=890 bgcolor=#E9E9E9
| 404890 ||  || — || November 19, 2008 || Kitt Peak || Spacewatch || — || align=right | 1.7 km || 
|-id=891 bgcolor=#E9E9E9
| 404891 ||  || — || April 10, 2005 || Kitt Peak || Spacewatch || — || align=right | 1.7 km || 
|-id=892 bgcolor=#d6d6d6
| 404892 ||  || — || February 9, 2007 || Mount Lemmon || Mount Lemmon Survey || — || align=right | 3.1 km || 
|-id=893 bgcolor=#d6d6d6
| 404893 ||  || — || January 17, 2007 || Kitt Peak || Spacewatch || — || align=right | 3.0 km || 
|-id=894 bgcolor=#E9E9E9
| 404894 ||  || — || April 2, 2005 || Catalina || CSS || — || align=right | 2.2 km || 
|-id=895 bgcolor=#d6d6d6
| 404895 ||  || — || January 19, 2002 || Kitt Peak || Spacewatch || — || align=right | 5.9 km || 
|-id=896 bgcolor=#E9E9E9
| 404896 ||  || — || November 19, 2003 || Kitt Peak || Spacewatch || — || align=right | 1.5 km || 
|-id=897 bgcolor=#d6d6d6
| 404897 ||  || — || October 22, 2006 || Kitt Peak || Spacewatch || — || align=right | 3.1 km || 
|-id=898 bgcolor=#fefefe
| 404898 ||  || — || October 27, 2005 || Mount Lemmon || Mount Lemmon Survey || — || align=right data-sort-value="0.94" | 940 m || 
|-id=899 bgcolor=#E9E9E9
| 404899 ||  || — || May 28, 2000 || Socorro || LINEAR || — || align=right | 2.3 km || 
|-id=900 bgcolor=#fefefe
| 404900 ||  || — || October 8, 2007 || Catalina || CSS || — || align=right | 1.2 km || 
|}

404901–405000 

|-bgcolor=#E9E9E9
| 404901 ||  || — || November 18, 2003 || Kitt Peak || Spacewatch || MAR || align=right | 1.4 km || 
|-id=902 bgcolor=#E9E9E9
| 404902 ||  || — || April 28, 2010 || WISE || WISE || — || align=right | 2.3 km || 
|-id=903 bgcolor=#d6d6d6
| 404903 ||  || — || October 22, 2006 || Mount Lemmon || Mount Lemmon Survey || — || align=right | 5.2 km || 
|-id=904 bgcolor=#fefefe
| 404904 ||  || — || April 22, 2007 || Catalina || CSS || V || align=right data-sort-value="0.76" | 760 m || 
|-id=905 bgcolor=#fefefe
| 404905 ||  || — || February 25, 2006 || Kitt Peak || Spacewatch || — || align=right data-sort-value="0.75" | 750 m || 
|-id=906 bgcolor=#fefefe
| 404906 ||  || — || February 14, 2002 || Kitt Peak || Spacewatch || NYS || align=right data-sort-value="0.82" | 820 m || 
|-id=907 bgcolor=#E9E9E9
| 404907 ||  || — || February 1, 2009 || Mount Lemmon || Mount Lemmon Survey || EUN || align=right | 1.3 km || 
|-id=908 bgcolor=#fefefe
| 404908 ||  || — || November 22, 2008 || Kitt Peak || Spacewatch || — || align=right data-sort-value="0.88" | 880 m || 
|-id=909 bgcolor=#d6d6d6
| 404909 ||  || — || April 4, 2008 || Kitt Peak || Spacewatch || — || align=right | 4.2 km || 
|-id=910 bgcolor=#E9E9E9
| 404910 ||  || — || March 15, 2005 || Mount Lemmon || Mount Lemmon Survey || — || align=right | 1.8 km || 
|-id=911 bgcolor=#d6d6d6
| 404911 ||  || — || November 4, 2005 || Mount Lemmon || Mount Lemmon Survey || — || align=right | 3.9 km || 
|-id=912 bgcolor=#d6d6d6
| 404912 ||  || — || February 25, 2007 || Mount Lemmon || Mount Lemmon Survey || — || align=right | 2.8 km || 
|-id=913 bgcolor=#d6d6d6
| 404913 ||  || — || May 1, 2003 || Kitt Peak || Spacewatch || — || align=right | 4.1 km || 
|-id=914 bgcolor=#d6d6d6
| 404914 ||  || — || April 7, 2008 || Mount Lemmon || Mount Lemmon Survey || — || align=right | 2.7 km || 
|-id=915 bgcolor=#fefefe
| 404915 ||  || — || March 18, 2010 || Mount Lemmon || Mount Lemmon Survey || NYS || align=right data-sort-value="0.61" | 610 m || 
|-id=916 bgcolor=#fefefe
| 404916 ||  || — || October 9, 2004 || Kitt Peak || Spacewatch || — || align=right | 1.2 km || 
|-id=917 bgcolor=#fefefe
| 404917 ||  || — || November 1, 2005 || Mount Lemmon || Mount Lemmon Survey || — || align=right data-sort-value="0.70" | 700 m || 
|-id=918 bgcolor=#d6d6d6
| 404918 ||  || — || December 27, 2005 || Kitt Peak || Spacewatch || — || align=right | 3.8 km || 
|-id=919 bgcolor=#E9E9E9
| 404919 ||  || — || October 4, 2006 || Mount Lemmon || Mount Lemmon Survey || — || align=right | 1.6 km || 
|-id=920 bgcolor=#fefefe
| 404920 ||  || — || November 20, 2008 || Kitt Peak || Spacewatch || — || align=right data-sort-value="0.86" | 860 m || 
|-id=921 bgcolor=#E9E9E9
| 404921 ||  || — || March 1, 2009 || Mount Lemmon || Mount Lemmon Survey || — || align=right | 1.0 km || 
|-id=922 bgcolor=#fefefe
| 404922 ||  || — || January 21, 2010 || WISE || WISE || — || align=right | 2.1 km || 
|-id=923 bgcolor=#fefefe
| 404923 ||  || — || June 16, 2007 || Kitt Peak || Spacewatch || — || align=right | 1.1 km || 
|-id=924 bgcolor=#E9E9E9
| 404924 ||  || — || January 1, 2009 || Kitt Peak || Spacewatch || — || align=right | 1.5 km || 
|-id=925 bgcolor=#fefefe
| 404925 ||  || — || December 12, 2012 || Mount Lemmon || Mount Lemmon Survey || — || align=right data-sort-value="0.81" | 810 m || 
|-id=926 bgcolor=#E9E9E9
| 404926 ||  || — || December 22, 2003 || Kitt Peak || Spacewatch || — || align=right | 2.2 km || 
|-id=927 bgcolor=#E9E9E9
| 404927 ||  || — || April 26, 2009 || Catalina || CSS || — || align=right | 1.7 km || 
|-id=928 bgcolor=#fefefe
| 404928 ||  || — || March 17, 2010 || Mount Lemmon || Mount Lemmon Survey || — || align=right data-sort-value="0.94" | 940 m || 
|-id=929 bgcolor=#E9E9E9
| 404929 ||  || — || October 25, 2007 || Mount Lemmon || Mount Lemmon Survey || — || align=right | 1.3 km || 
|-id=930 bgcolor=#fefefe
| 404930 ||  || — || March 23, 2003 || Kitt Peak || Spacewatch || — || align=right data-sort-value="0.77" | 770 m || 
|-id=931 bgcolor=#fefefe
| 404931 ||  || — || February 15, 2010 || Kitt Peak || Spacewatch || — || align=right data-sort-value="0.79" | 790 m || 
|-id=932 bgcolor=#E9E9E9
| 404932 ||  || — || January 17, 2009 || Kitt Peak || Spacewatch || — || align=right | 1.6 km || 
|-id=933 bgcolor=#d6d6d6
| 404933 ||  || — || January 17, 2007 || Kitt Peak || Spacewatch || — || align=right | 4.2 km || 
|-id=934 bgcolor=#fefefe
| 404934 ||  || — || December 22, 2008 || Kitt Peak || Spacewatch || V || align=right data-sort-value="0.75" | 750 m || 
|-id=935 bgcolor=#E9E9E9
| 404935 ||  || — || June 20, 2010 || Mount Lemmon || Mount Lemmon Survey || — || align=right | 2.1 km || 
|-id=936 bgcolor=#fefefe
| 404936 ||  || — || October 5, 2007 || Siding Spring || SSS || — || align=right data-sort-value="0.95" | 950 m || 
|-id=937 bgcolor=#d6d6d6
| 404937 ||  || — || November 1, 2010 || Mount Lemmon || Mount Lemmon Survey || — || align=right | 4.0 km || 
|-id=938 bgcolor=#d6d6d6
| 404938 ||  || — || December 15, 2006 || Mount Lemmon || Mount Lemmon Survey || — || align=right | 4.0 km || 
|-id=939 bgcolor=#fefefe
| 404939 ||  || — || April 16, 2007 || Catalina || CSS || — || align=right data-sort-value="0.74" | 740 m || 
|-id=940 bgcolor=#d6d6d6
| 404940 ||  || — || February 23, 2007 || Mount Lemmon || Mount Lemmon Survey || — || align=right | 2.9 km || 
|-id=941 bgcolor=#d6d6d6
| 404941 ||  || — || September 22, 2009 || Catalina || CSS || — || align=right | 3.1 km || 
|-id=942 bgcolor=#E9E9E9
| 404942 ||  || — || March 16, 2004 || Siding Spring || SSS || — || align=right | 2.4 km || 
|-id=943 bgcolor=#E9E9E9
| 404943 || 6824 P-L || — || September 24, 1960 || Palomar || PLS || — || align=right | 1.2 km || 
|-id=944 bgcolor=#d6d6d6
| 404944 ||  || — || October 16, 1977 || Palomar || PLS || — || align=right | 2.1 km || 
|-id=945 bgcolor=#E9E9E9
| 404945 ||  || — || March 7, 1981 || Siding Spring || S. J. Bus || — || align=right | 2.9 km || 
|-id=946 bgcolor=#d6d6d6
| 404946 ||  || — || October 9, 1993 || La Silla || E. W. Elst || — || align=right | 2.8 km || 
|-id=947 bgcolor=#E9E9E9
| 404947 ||  || — || September 18, 1995 || Kitt Peak || Spacewatch || — || align=right | 2.4 km || 
|-id=948 bgcolor=#d6d6d6
| 404948 ||  || — || December 18, 1995 || Kitt Peak || Spacewatch || EOS || align=right | 2.1 km || 
|-id=949 bgcolor=#E9E9E9
| 404949 ||  || — || April 9, 1996 || Kitt Peak || Spacewatch || MAR || align=right | 1.3 km || 
|-id=950 bgcolor=#E9E9E9
| 404950 ||  || — || October 8, 1996 || Haleakala || NEAT || — || align=right | 2.8 km || 
|-id=951 bgcolor=#E9E9E9
| 404951 ||  || — || October 4, 1996 || Kitt Peak || Spacewatch || — || align=right | 2.7 km || 
|-id=952 bgcolor=#E9E9E9
| 404952 ||  || — || October 7, 1996 || Kitt Peak || Spacewatch || GEF || align=right | 1.2 km || 
|-id=953 bgcolor=#d6d6d6
| 404953 ||  || — || November 10, 1996 || Kitt Peak || Spacewatch || 7:4 || align=right | 3.8 km || 
|-id=954 bgcolor=#fefefe
| 404954 ||  || — || December 7, 1996 || Kitt Peak || Spacewatch || — || align=right data-sort-value="0.73" | 730 m || 
|-id=955 bgcolor=#E9E9E9
| 404955 ||  || — || September 23, 1997 || Kitt Peak || Spacewatch || — || align=right | 1.6 km || 
|-id=956 bgcolor=#fefefe
| 404956 ||  || — || January 18, 1998 || Kitt Peak || Spacewatch || — || align=right data-sort-value="0.86" | 860 m || 
|-id=957 bgcolor=#E9E9E9
| 404957 ||  || — || January 29, 1998 || Kitt Peak || Spacewatch || MRX || align=right data-sort-value="0.80" | 800 m || 
|-id=958 bgcolor=#FA8072
| 404958 ||  || — || February 25, 1998 || Haleakala || NEAT || — || align=right data-sort-value="0.99" | 990 m || 
|-id=959 bgcolor=#d6d6d6
| 404959 ||  || — || September 13, 1998 || Kitt Peak || Spacewatch || — || align=right | 3.5 km || 
|-id=960 bgcolor=#d6d6d6
| 404960 ||  || — || September 14, 1998 || Socorro || LINEAR || — || align=right | 4.5 km || 
|-id=961 bgcolor=#d6d6d6
| 404961 ||  || — || September 20, 1998 || Kitt Peak || Spacewatch || — || align=right | 2.9 km || 
|-id=962 bgcolor=#E9E9E9
| 404962 ||  || — || September 24, 1998 || Kitt Peak || Spacewatch || — || align=right data-sort-value="0.81" | 810 m || 
|-id=963 bgcolor=#d6d6d6
| 404963 ||  || — || September 28, 1998 || Kitt Peak || Spacewatch || THM || align=right | 1.8 km || 
|-id=964 bgcolor=#d6d6d6
| 404964 ||  || — || September 26, 1998 || Socorro || LINEAR || — || align=right | 5.1 km || 
|-id=965 bgcolor=#d6d6d6
| 404965 ||  || — || October 12, 1998 || Kitt Peak || Spacewatch || LIXcritical || align=right | 2.5 km || 
|-id=966 bgcolor=#d6d6d6
| 404966 ||  || — || October 13, 1998 || Kitt Peak || Spacewatch || THM || align=right | 2.0 km || 
|-id=967 bgcolor=#fefefe
| 404967 ||  || — || January 13, 1999 || Kitt Peak || Spacewatch || — || align=right data-sort-value="0.81" | 810 m || 
|-id=968 bgcolor=#fefefe
| 404968 ||  || — || October 3, 1999 || Kitt Peak || Spacewatch || MAS || align=right data-sort-value="0.66" | 660 m || 
|-id=969 bgcolor=#d6d6d6
| 404969 ||  || — || October 6, 1999 || Kitt Peak || Spacewatch || — || align=right | 2.8 km || 
|-id=970 bgcolor=#d6d6d6
| 404970 ||  || — || October 14, 1999 || Socorro || LINEAR || — || align=right | 4.8 km || 
|-id=971 bgcolor=#fefefe
| 404971 ||  || — || October 15, 1999 || Socorro || LINEAR || — || align=right data-sort-value="0.82" | 820 m || 
|-id=972 bgcolor=#d6d6d6
| 404972 ||  || — || October 15, 1999 || Kitt Peak || Spacewatch || 3:2 || align=right | 4.0 km || 
|-id=973 bgcolor=#d6d6d6
| 404973 ||  || — || October 29, 1999 || Kitt Peak || Spacewatch || EOS || align=right | 1.8 km || 
|-id=974 bgcolor=#fefefe
| 404974 ||  || — || November 5, 1999 || Kitt Peak || Spacewatch || — || align=right data-sort-value="0.85" | 850 m || 
|-id=975 bgcolor=#d6d6d6
| 404975 ||  || — || November 4, 1999 || Socorro || LINEAR || — || align=right | 3.1 km || 
|-id=976 bgcolor=#d6d6d6
| 404976 ||  || — || November 9, 1999 || Socorro || LINEAR || — || align=right | 4.0 km || 
|-id=977 bgcolor=#d6d6d6
| 404977 ||  || — || November 9, 1999 || Socorro || LINEAR || Tj (2.93) || align=right | 6.4 km || 
|-id=978 bgcolor=#d6d6d6
| 404978 ||  || — || November 30, 1999 || Kitt Peak || Spacewatch || — || align=right | 2.9 km || 
|-id=979 bgcolor=#d6d6d6
| 404979 ||  || — || December 2, 1999 || Kitt Peak || Spacewatch || Tj (2.96) || align=right | 4.0 km || 
|-id=980 bgcolor=#d6d6d6
| 404980 ||  || — || November 15, 1999 || Kitt Peak || Spacewatch || — || align=right | 3.0 km || 
|-id=981 bgcolor=#d6d6d6
| 404981 ||  || — || December 9, 1999 || Kitt Peak || Spacewatch || — || align=right | 2.1 km || 
|-id=982 bgcolor=#d6d6d6
| 404982 ||  || — || December 4, 1999 || Kitt Peak || Spacewatch || — || align=right | 4.0 km || 
|-id=983 bgcolor=#d6d6d6
| 404983 ||  || — || December 7, 1999 || Socorro || LINEAR || — || align=right | 3.2 km || 
|-id=984 bgcolor=#d6d6d6
| 404984 ||  || — || December 16, 1999 || Kitt Peak || Spacewatch || — || align=right | 2.2 km || 
|-id=985 bgcolor=#d6d6d6
| 404985 ||  || — || January 8, 2000 || Kitt Peak || Spacewatch || — || align=right | 3.6 km || 
|-id=986 bgcolor=#d6d6d6
| 404986 ||  || — || January 27, 2000 || Kitt Peak || Spacewatch || — || align=right | 2.7 km || 
|-id=987 bgcolor=#d6d6d6
| 404987 ||  || — || February 2, 2000 || Socorro || LINEAR || Tj (2.95) || align=right | 4.7 km || 
|-id=988 bgcolor=#d6d6d6
| 404988 ||  || — || February 7, 2000 || Kitt Peak || Spacewatch || — || align=right | 3.8 km || 
|-id=989 bgcolor=#d6d6d6
| 404989 ||  || — || February 26, 2000 || Kitt Peak || Spacewatch || — || align=right | 2.9 km || 
|-id=990 bgcolor=#E9E9E9
| 404990 ||  || — || February 29, 2000 || Socorro || LINEAR || — || align=right | 1.6 km || 
|-id=991 bgcolor=#d6d6d6
| 404991 ||  || — || March 2, 2000 || Kitt Peak || Spacewatch || — || align=right | 3.2 km || 
|-id=992 bgcolor=#d6d6d6
| 404992 ||  || — || April 5, 2000 || Socorro || LINEAR || Tj (2.99) || align=right | 3.5 km || 
|-id=993 bgcolor=#E9E9E9
| 404993 ||  || — || April 12, 2000 || Haleakala || NEAT || — || align=right | 2.1 km || 
|-id=994 bgcolor=#E9E9E9
| 404994 ||  || — || August 26, 2000 || Socorro || LINEAR || — || align=right | 2.7 km || 
|-id=995 bgcolor=#fefefe
| 404995 ||  || — || August 31, 2000 || Socorro || LINEAR || — || align=right data-sort-value="0.78" | 780 m || 
|-id=996 bgcolor=#E9E9E9
| 404996 ||  || — || September 3, 2000 || Socorro || LINEAR || TIN || align=right | 1.1 km || 
|-id=997 bgcolor=#E9E9E9
| 404997 ||  || — || September 2, 2000 || Anderson Mesa || LONEOS || — || align=right | 4.5 km || 
|-id=998 bgcolor=#E9E9E9
| 404998 ||  || — || September 24, 2000 || Socorro || LINEAR || — || align=right | 2.1 km || 
|-id=999 bgcolor=#E9E9E9
| 404999 ||  || — || September 25, 2000 || Socorro || LINEAR || — || align=right | 3.0 km || 
|-id=000 bgcolor=#E9E9E9
| 405000 ||  || — || September 27, 2000 || Socorro || LINEAR || DOR || align=right | 2.8 km || 
|}

References

External links 
 Discovery Circumstances: Numbered Minor Planets (400001)–(405000) (IAU Minor Planet Center)

0404